This is a list of topics related to Malaysia.

Buildings and structures in Malaysia
 Alor Setar Tower
 Angkasapuri
 Berjaya Times Square
 Chin Swee Temple
 Connaught Bridge Power Station
Four Seasons Place KL
 Kellie's Castle
 Kelong
 Kota Ngah Ibrahim
 Kuala Lumpur City Centre (KLCC)
 Kuala Lumpur Tower
 Malay houses
 Malaysian Houses of Parliament
 Malaysian National Projects
Merdeka 118
 National Grid, Malaysia
 Pudu Prison
 Petronas Towers
 Southern Integrated Gateway
The Exchange 106 (TRX)
 Wan Mat Saman Aqueduct

Airports in Malaysia

Malaysia Peninsular
Alor Star (AOR)
Ipoh (IPH)
Johor Bahru (JHB)
Kota Bharu (KBR)
Kerteh (KTE)
Kuantan (K)
Kuala Lumpur International Airport (KLIA)
Langkawi International Airport  (LGK)
Mersing (MEP)
Malacca International Airport (MKZ)
Penang International Airport (PEN)
Pangkor (PKG) •
Redang (RDN) •
Subang (SZB) •
Kuala Terengganu (TGG) •
Tioman (TOD) •
Taiping (TPG) •
Tekah •
Kluang (WMAP) •
Gong Kedak (WMGK) •
Sungai Besi (WMKF)

East Malaysia
 Ba'kelalan Airport
 Bario Sarawak Airport
 Belaga Airport|Belaga
 Bintulu (BTU) •
 Kapit (KPI) •
 Keningau (KGU) •
 Kota Kinabalu International Airport (BKI) •
 Kuching International Airport (KCH) •
 Kudat (KUD) •
 Labuan (LBU) •
 Lahad Datu (LDU) •
 Lawas (LWY) •
 Limbang (LMN) •
 Long Akah (LKH) •
 Long Banga (LBP) •
 Long Lellang (LGL) •
 Long Pasia (GSA) •
 Long Semado (LSM) •
 Long Seridan (ODN) •
 Marudi (MUR) •
 Miri (MYY) •
 Mukah (MKM) •
 Mulu Airport|Mulu (MZV)
 Pamol Airport|Pamol (PAY)
 Ranau Airport|Ranau (RNU)
 Sahabat Airport|Sahabat (SXS)
 Sandakan (SDK) •
 Sematan Airport|Sematan (BSE)
 Semporna Airport|Semporna (SMM)
 Sepulut Airport|Sepulut (SPE)
 Sibu (SBW) •
 Simanggang Airport|Simanggang (SGG)
 Tanjung Manis Airport|Tanjung Manis;(WBGT)
 Tawau (TWU) •
 Tommanggong Airport|Tommanggong (TMG)

Amusement parks in Malaysia
 Austin Heights Water & Adventure Park
A' Famosa Resort
Bangi Wonderland
Berjaya Times Square Theme Park
Borneo Samariang Water Park
Bukit Gambang Water Park
Bukit Merah Laketown Resort
Desaru Coast Adventure Waterpark
ESCAPE Challenge Adventure Park
ESCAPE Theme Park
Genting SkyWorlds
i-City Theme Park & Water Park
Legoland Malaysia
Melaka Wonderland Theme Park & Resort
Skytropolis Funland
Splash Out Water Theme Park
 Sunway Lagoon
Sunway Lost World of Tambun
 The Carnivall Sungai Petani
Wet World Water Park

Bridges in Malaysia
 Connaught Bridge
 Jambatan Buloh Kasap
 Jambatan Dabong
 Jambatan Iskandariah
 Jambatan Kota
 Jambatan Kuala Krai
 Jambatan Parit Sulong
 Jambatan Raja Pemaisuri Bainun
 Jambatan Sultan Abdul Jalil Shah
 Jambatan Sultan Ahmad Shah
 Jambatan Sultan Ahmad Shah II
 Jambatan Sultan Azlan Shah
 Jambatan Sultan Idris Shah II
 Jambatan Sultan Ismail
 Jambatan Sultan Ismail Petra
 Jambatan Sultan Mahmud
 Jambatan Sultan Salahuddin Abdul Aziz Shah
 Jambatan Sultan Yahya Petra
 Malaysia–Singapore Second Link
 Merdeka Bridge, Malaysia
 Muar Second Bridge
 Penang Bridge
 Penang Second Bridge
 Permas Jaya Bridge
 Pulau Bunting Bridge
 Sungai Johor Bridge
 Sungai Linggi Bridge

Bridges in Putrajaya
 Monorail Suspension Bridge
 Putra Bridge
 Seri Bakti Bridge
 Seri Bestari Bridge
 Seri Gemilang Bridge
 Seri Perdana Bridge
 Seri Saujana Bridge
 Seri Setia Bridge
 Seri Wawasan Bridge

Buildings and structures in Kuching
 Kuching International Airport
 Petra Jaya State Mosque
 Sarawak Convention and Exhibition Centre
 Sarawak Museum
 Sarawak Stadium
 Swinburne University of Technology Sarawak Campus
 Wisma Bapa Malaysia
 Hong San Si Temple
 Tua Pek Kong Temple

Buildings and structures in Malacca
 A Famosa
 Stadthuys Building
 Cheng Hoon Teng Temple
 Poh San Teng Temple
 Church of Saint Paul, Malacca
 Cape Rachado Lighthouse
 Sri Poyatha Moorthi Temple
 Kampung Hulu Mosque
 Proclamation of Independence Memorial

Buildings and structures in Penang
 Penang State Assembly Building
 Bayan Lepas International Airport
 Penang Times Square
 Khoo Kongsi
 Pinang Peranakan Mansion
 Cheong Fatt Tze Mansion
 Macalister Mansion
 Kek Lok Si
 Dhammikarama Burmese Temple
 Mahindarama Buddhist Temple
 Wat Chayamangkalaram
 Arulmigu Balathandayuthapani Temple, Penang
 Lebuh Aceh Mosque
 Millennium Tower (Penang, Malaysia)
 Fort Cornwallis
 KOMTAR
 Penang Adventist Hospital

Buildings and Structures in Kedah
 Balai Nobat
 Zahir Mosque
 Balai Besar
 Alor Setar Tower
 Langkawi Cable Car
 Dataran Lang

Buildings and structures in Putrajaya
 Istana Darul Ehsan
 Melawati National Palace
 Millennium Monument (Malaysia)
 Palace of Justice (Malaysia)
 Perdana Putra
 Putra Mosque
 Putrajaya Convention Centre
 Putrajaya Landmark
 Putrajaya Ministry of Finance
 Seri Perdana

Casinos in Malaysia
 Genting Highlands

Cemeteries in Malaysia

 Alor Gajah British Graveyard
 Bukit Cina
 Labuan War Cemetery
 Nilai Memorial Park
 Nirvana Memorial Park
 Taiping War Cemetery
 Taman Selatan
 Tanjung Kupang Memorial
 Pinubung Jabung

Dams in Malaysia

 Air Itam Dam
 Babagon Dam
 Bakun Dam
 Batang Ai Dam
 Beris Dam
 Batu Dam
 Chenderoh Dam
 Kenyir Dam
 Klang Gates Dam
 Mengkuang Dam
 Pedu Lake
 Pergau Dam
 Teluk Bahang Dam
 Temenggor Dam

Houses in Malaysia

Mausoleums in Malaysia
 Kedah royal mausoleum
 Makam Mahmoodiah
 Makam Mahsuri
 Makam Pahlawan
 Makam Sultan Abdul Samad
 Makam Sultan Ali of Johor
 Makam Sultan Mahmud Mangkat Dijulang
 Masjid Abidin
 Masjid Al-Muktafi Billah Shah
 Masjid Sultan Sulaiman
 Perak royal mausoleum
 Sabah State Mosque
 Tun Datu Mustapha Memorial

Monuments and memorials in Malaysia
 National Monument (Malaysia) or Tugu Negara
 National Heroes Square (Malaysia)
 Cho Huan Lai Memorial
 Melaka Warrior Monument
 Petagas War Memorial
 Penang War Memorial
 Sandakan Massacre Memorial
 Kundasang War Memorial
 Double Six Monument
 Queen Victoria Memorial, Penang
 Tugu Keris
 Millennium Monument (Malaysia)
 Kuala Klawang Memorial or Martin Lister Memorial 
 Mat Salleh Memorial

Museums in Malaysia

Palaces in Malaysia
 Istana Negara, Kuala Lumpur
Istana Melawati

Places of worship in Malaysia

Mosques in Malaysia
 Federal Territory Mosque
 Masjid Jamek
 Kampong Hulu mosque
 Kampung Keling mosque
 Kota Kinabalu City Mosque
 Masjid Abidin
 Masjid Al Azim
 Masjid Al Mujaheddin
 Masjid Al Taqwa
 Masjid Al-Falak
 Masjid Al-Muktafi Billah Shah
 Masjid Alaeddin
 Masjid An-Nur Kotaraya
 Masjid As Syakirin
 Masjid Darul Ehsan
 Masjid Diraja Pasir Pelangi
 Masjid Jamek Bandar Baru UDA
 Masjid Jamek Kampung Melayu Majidee
 Masjid Jamek Larkin
 Masjid Jamek Nong Chik
 Masjid Jamek Pasir Gudang
 Masjid Jamek Seremban
 Masjid Jamek Sultan Abdul Aziz Shah
 Masjid Jamek Sultan Ibrahim
 Masjid Jamek Sultan Ismail
 Masjid Jamek Taman Pelangi
 Masjid Kampung Baru
 Masjid Kampung Laut
 Masjid Kapitan Kling
 Masjid Lebuh Aceh
 Masjid Negeri Petra Jaya
 Masjid Negeri Seremban
 Masjid Negeri Sultan Abu Bakar
 Masjid Negeri Sultan Ahmad Shah
 Masjid Negeri Sultan Idris Shah
 Masjid Puchong Perdana
 Masjid Raja Alang
 Masjid Saidina Umar Al-Khattab
 Masjid Saidina Uthman Bin Affan
 Masjid Sultan Abdul Samad
 Masjid Sultan Ibrahim
 Masjid Sultan Sulaiman
 Masjid Tengku Tengah Zaharah
 Masjid Tun Abdul Aziz
 Masjid Ungku Tun Aminah
 Masjid Yayasan Mohammad Noah
 Masjid Zahir
 Masjid Negara
 Penang State Mosque
 Putra Mosque
 Sabah State Mosque
 Straits Mosque, Melaka
 Subang Airport Mosque
 Sultan Salahuddin Abdul Aziz Mosque
 Tranquerah Mosque
 Ubudiah Mosque

Hindu temples in Malaysia
Sort by state
Kedah
 Sri Maha Mariamman Devasthanam                Alor Setar
 Sri Thandayuthapani Kovil                     Alor Setar

Penang
 Sri Mariamman Temple, Penang
 Sri Sangilikarrupar Kaliamman Temple          Butterworth, Penang
 Sri Jalan Baru Muneeswarar Temple             Butterworth, Penang
 Sri Thandayuthapani Kovil                     Penang

Perak
 Sri Thandayuthapani Kovil                     Ipoh
 Sri Thandayuthapani Kovil                     Teluk Intan
 Sri Muthu Mariamman Kovil                     Batu Gajah
 Sri Maha Naga Kanniamman Kovil                Batu Gajah
 Sri Subramaniyar Swami Kovil                  Batu Gajah
 Kanthan Kallumalai Sri Kaliamman Kovil        Kuala Kangsar, Chemor

Perlis
 Arulmigu Arumugaswamy Temple                  Wang Bintong, Kangar
 Sree Kamatchi Amman Temple                    Padang Besar, Arau
 Dewi Sri Mariamman Sabha Temple               Arau
 Sri Nageshwary Amman Temple                   Padang Pauh
 Sri Maha Muniswarar Temple                    Kangar

Selangor
 Batu Caves Sri Subramaniam Devasthanam
 Sri Subramaniar Alayam                        Sepang, Selangor
 Sri Sitthi Vinayagar Kovil                    P.J., Selangor
 Sri Sakthi Easwari Kovil                      P.J., Selangor
 Sri Shivan Temple                             Bukit Gasing, Selangor
 Sri Subramaniar Kovil                         P.J., Selangor
 Sri Subramania Swamy Kovil                    Klang, Selangor
 Sri Sivan Kovil                               Kota Road, Klang, Selangor
 Sri Maha Mariamman Kovil                      Klang, Selangor
 Sri Selva Vinayagar Kovil                     Klang, Selangor
 Sri Raja Rajeswary Kovil                      Ampang
 Sri Sakthi Vinayagar Alayam                   Ampang
 Sri Subramaniaswami Temple Paribalana Sabai   Kajang
 Sri Sundaraja Perumal Kovil Klang, Selangor
 Sri Maha Mariamman Temple                     Telok Panglima Garang, Banting
 Sri Maha Mariamman Temple                     Klang (Istana)
 Sri Vartharaja Perumal Temple                 SS 13 Subang Jaya, Selangor
 Sri Verrakathy Vinayagar Temple               Rawang, Selangor
 Devi Sri Karumariamman Temple                 Klang, Selangor

Negeri Sembilan
 Sri Maha Mariamman Temple                     Gemencheh, Tampin

Melaka
Sri Subramaniar Thuropathai Amman Alayam       (( Gajah Berang Melaka))
Sri Subramaniar Alayam                         ((Batu Berendam Melaka))
Sri Mutu Mariaman Alayam               ((Bukit Beruang Melaka))
Sri Maha Mariamman Temple                      (( Gajah Berang Melaka ))
Sri Maha Mariamman Temple                      (( Pengakalan Rama Melaka ))
Sri Maa Veeran Temple (Madurai Veeran Temple)   ((Melaka))

Johor
Glass Temple, Johor Bahru

Pahang

Terengganu
 Sri Maha Mariamman Temple,                    Chukai, Kemaman
 Sri Kaliyuga Durga Lakshmi Amman Temple,      Jalan Cherong Lanjut, Kuala Terengganu
 Sri Soola Amman Temple,                       Kuala Terengganu
 Sri Maha Mariamman,                           Kerteh, Kemaman

Kelantan

Sabah

Sarawak
 Sri Srinivasagar Kaliamman Temple             Ban Hock Road, Kuching, Sarawak
 Sri Maha Mariamman Temple                     Batu Lintang, Kuching, Sarawak
 Mount Matang Maha Mariamman Temple            Mount Matang, Kuching, Sarawak

Wilayah Persekutuan
 Sri Mahamariamman Temple, Kuala Lumpur
 Sri Kandaswamy Kovil, Brickfields
 Sri Maha Eeswaran Temple                      Kg. Bumi Hijau, Setapak, Kuala Lumpur
 Sri Thandayuthapani Kovil                     Kuala Lumpur
 Sri Maha Mariamman Kovil Kepong,          Kuala Lumpur

Buddhist Temples in Malaysia
 Buddhist Maha Vihara, Brickfields, Kuala Lumpur
 Sri Lanka Buddhist Temple, Sentul, Kuala Lumpur
 Samnak Sambodhi Buddhist Temple (三宝寺), Kepong, Kuala Lumpur
 BMSM Samadhi Vihara, Shah Alam, Selangor
 Subang Jaya Buddhist Association, Selangor
 Klang and Coast Buddhist Association (KCBA), Selangor 
 Kinrara Metta Buddhist Society, Puchong, Selangor
 Lokamitta Buddhist Fellowship Malaysia, Selangor
 Ariya Vihara Buddhist Society, Selangor
 Maha Satipatthana Buddhist Society, Selangor
 Wat Chetawan, Petaling Jaya, Selangor
 Wat Phothivihan, Tumpat, Kelantan
 Wat Machimmaram, Tumpat, Kelantan
 Wat Prachumthat Canaram, Tumpat, Kelantan
 Wat Phikulthong Vararam, Tumpat, Kelantan
 Wat Phikulyai, Tumpat, Kelantan
 Wat Mai Suwankiri, Tumpat, Kelantan
 Wat Uttamaram, Pasir Mas, Kelantan
 Wat Khosakaram, Pasir Mas, Kelantan
 Wat Pracacinaram, Wakaf Bharu, Kelantan
 Wat Uthissak Thammo Wararam, Gua Musang, Kelantan
 Wat Pathumviharn, Bachok, Kelantan
 Wat Phothikyan Phutthaktham, Bachok, Kelantan
 Wat Macchimaprasit Jejawi, Arau, Perlis
 Wat Kubang Tiga, Perlis
 Wat Samosornrajanukpradit (Wat Siam Bakar Bata), Alor Setar, Kedah
 Wat Nikrodharam, Alor Setar, Kedah
 Wat Lampam, Alor Setar, Kedah
 Wat Wanakrattanaram, Alor Setar, Kedah
 Wat Damrongratanaram, Sungai Petani, Kedah
 Wat Samagghiratanaram, Sungai Petani, Kedah
 Wat Visutthipradittharam, Pendang, Kedah
 Wat Thepsuwannaram, Pendang, Kedah
 Wat Thepbandit, Pendang, Kedah
 Wat Thamkhiriwong, Pendang, Kedah
 Wat Kalai, Gurun, Kedah
 Wat Thai Charern, Gurun, Kedah
 Wat Boonyaram, Jitra, Kedah
 Wat Jitraram, Jitra, Kedah
 Wat Phodhichetiyaram (Sacred Luang Pu Thuad Site), Kedah
 Wat Buddhayapatitharam (Wat Olak Madu), Padang Serai, Kedah
 Wat Barn Tas, Baling, Kedah
 Wat Phrathad Palelai, Baling, Kedah
 Wat Thepchumnum, Kuala Nerang, Kedah
 Wat Phikulthararam, Pedu, Kedah
 Wat Tham Kisap, Langkawi, Kedah
 Wat Koh Wanararm, Langkawi, Kedah
 Buddhist Hermitage Lunas, Kedah
 Dhamma Vijaya Forest Monastery, Terengganu
 Bodhi Vihara, Terengganu
 Wat Chaiya Mangkalaram, Penang
 Wat Buppharam, Penang
 Mahindarama Buddhist Temple, Penang
 Dhammikarama Burmese Temple, Penang
 Nibbinda Forest Monastery, Penang
 Sasanarakkha Buddhist Sanctuary, Taiping, Perak
 Sukhavana Meditation Monastery, Ipoh, Perak
 Vihara Buddha Gotama, Temoh, Perak
 Wat Sitawanaram, Sitiawan, Perak
 Seck Kia Eenh Temple, Malacca
 Dhammacakka Buddha Vihara (Bukit Rambai Buddhist Temple), Malacca
 Brahmavihara Monastery & Retreat Centre (梵行寺禅林), Malacca
 Santi Forest Monastery, Ulu Tiram, Johor Bahru
 Metta Lodge, Taman Johor Jaya
 Samadhi Meditation Centre, Pontian, Johor
 Kolam Sammaditthi Monastery, Segamat, Johor
 Kek Lok Si (极乐寺), Penang
 Sam Poh Temple (三寶萬佛寺), Brinchang, Pahang
 Pahang Buddhist Association (万佛殿), Kuantan
 Sam Poh Tong Temple (三寶洞), Ipoh, Perak
 Kek Look Seah Temple (極樂社), Ipoh, Perak
 Chempaka Buddhist Lodge (千百家佛教居士林), Petaling Jaya, Selangor
 Poh Lum Fatt Yuen (寶林法苑), Petaling Jaya, Selangor
 Kwan Inn Teng Temple (八打灵观音亭), Petaling Jaya, Selangor
 Sau Seng Lum Buddhist Temple (修成林), Petaling Jaya, Selangor
 Yuan Lin Xiao Zhot Buddhist Temple (园林小筑), Petaling Jaya, Selangor
 Fo Guang Shan Dong Zen Temple (佛光山東禪寺), Jenjarom, Selangor
 Guan Yin Gu Si Temple (新古毛观音古寺), Kuala Kubu Baru, Selangor
 Xiang Lin Si Temple (香林寺), Malacca
 Ching Giap See Temple (麻坡净业寺), Muar, Johor
 Labuan Buddhist Association
 Dhamma Vijaya Buddhist Association, Kuching, Sarawak
 Ching San Yen Temple (古晋青山巖), Kuching, Sarawak
 Puu Jih Shih Temple (普济寺), Sandakan, Sabah
 Pu Tuo Si Temple (亞庇佛教居士林普陀寺), Kota Kinabalu, Sabah
 Fo Guang Shan Temple, Tawau, Sabah

Chinese Temples in Malaysia
 Jade Emperor God Temple (玉皇廟), Penang (founded in 1869)
 Goddess of Mercy Temple, Penang (founded in 1728)
 Snake Temple, Penang (founded in 1805)
 Eng Chuan Tong Tan Kongsi, Penang (founded in 1878)
 Khoo Kongsi, Penang
 Tanjung Tokong Tua Pek Kong Temple, Penang
 Dou Mu Gong Temple (头条路斗母宫), Macallum Street Ghaut, Penang
 Ho Ann Kiong Temple (护安宫), Terengganu (founded in 1801)
 Tian Hou Gong Temple (天后宫), Terengganu (founded in 1896)
 Seng Choon Kiong (Mazu Temple) (聖春宫), Kampung Tokong, Ketereh, Kelantan
 Tokong Swee Nyet Keung (Tokong Mek) (水月宫), Gua Musang, Kelantan
 Seng Hin Kiong (圣兴宫), Kota Bharu, Kelantan
 Hock Teik Soo Temple (吉打鲁乃福德祠), Lunas, Kedah (founded in 1889)
 Tou Mu Kung Temple, Alor Setar,  Kedah
 Langkawi Thean Hou Temple, Kuah, Kedah
 Then Sze Khoon Temple (沉香蜈蚣山天師宫), Seremban, Negeri Sembilan
 Chin Swee Caves Temple, Pahang
 Tua Pek Kong Temple (品仙祠大伯公庙), Sitiawan, Perak
 Hon San Si Temple (鳳山寺), Taiping, Perak
 Hock Soon Temple (福顺宫), Teluk Intan, Perak (founded in 1845)
 Kuan Ti Temple (關帝古廟), Batu Gajah, Perak
 Sin Sze Si Ya Temple (仙四師爺廟), Kuala Lumpur (founded in 1864)
 Thean Hou Temple, Kuala Lumpur
 Kuala Lumpur Kuan Ti Temple (吉隆坡关帝庙), Jalan Tun H.S. Lee, Kuala Lumpur (founded in 1887)
 Chan See Shu Yuen Temple, Jalan Petaling, Kuala Lumpur (founded in 1897)
 Kuan Yin Temple (观音寺), Jalan Maharajalela, Kuala Lumpur (founded in 1880)
 Cheok Beh Keing Temple (石马宫) or Tokong China Sentul, Sentul Pasar, Kuala Lumpur (founded in 1895)
 Choo Sing Tong Temple (聚星堂), Jalan Ipoh, Kuala Lumpur
 Sam Kow Tong Temple (三教堂), Brickfields, Kuala Lumpur
 Kau Ong Yah Lam Thian Kiong Temple (安邦南天宮), Ampang, Selangor (founded in 1862)
 Klang Kuan Im Teng (巴生观音亭), Klang, Selangor (founded in 1892)
 Kai Hong Hoo Temple (巴生开封府) or Justice Of Bao Temple, Klang, Selangor
 Klang Hong San Si Temple (巴生直落玻璃凤山寺公会), Klang, Selangor
 Ban Siew Keng Temple (仁嘉隆萬壽宮),  Jenjarom, Selangor
 Tung Loh Temple (仁嘉隆铜锣庙), Jenjarom, Selangor (founded in 1910)
 Sin Ann Meow Temple (星安庙), Cheras, Selangor
 Hock Leng Keng Temple (双文丹福灵宫), Serendah, Selangor (founded in 1869)
 Kam Yin Teng Temple (万挠感应亭), Rawang, Selangor (founded in 1865)
 Sze Yeah Kong Temple (万挠师爷宫), Rawang, Selangor (founded in 1869)
 Thien Hock Kong Temple (沙白安南河边街天福宫), Sabak Bernam, Selangor (founded in 1890)
 Guan Di Temple (沙白安南河畔关帝庙), Sabak Bernam, Selangor
 Tiong Yee Temple (忠义庙), Batu Caves, Selangor
 Chee Choy Kong Temple (自在宫), Batu Caves, Selangor
 Nan Thian Keng Temple (南天宮), Pulau Ketam, Selangor
 Cheng Hoon Teng Temple (青云亭), Malacca (founded in 1673)
 Poh San Teng Temple (宝山亭), Malacca (founded in 1795)
 Johor Bahru Old Chinese Temple (柔佛古廟) (founded in 1870 or earlier)
 Sam Siang Keng (三善宫), Johor Bahru
 Ku Miau Temple Sungai Tiram (地南古廟), Johor Bahru
 Zheng Ann Old Temple (新山镇安古廟), Johor Bahru
 Tampoi Guan Di Miao Temple (新山淡杯关帝庙), Tampoi, Johor Bahru
 Taman Universiti Guan Ti Temple (大学城关帝庙), Taman Universiti, Johor Bahru
 Hien Tian Meow Old Temple (马西玄天上帝古廟), Masai, Johor
 Tua Pek Kong Temple (百万镇百万宫大伯公庙), Masai, Johor
 Bao An Gong Temple (四湾宝安宫), Sungai Rengit, Kota Tinggi, Johor
 Hong Sen Tai Tee Old Temple (新港洪仙大帝古庙), Kulai, Johor (founded in 1891)
 Wan Xian Miao Temple (古来萬仙廟), Kulai, Johor  (founded in 1913)
 Yuen Sun Kung Temple (古来云山宫), Kulai, Johor  (founded in 1933)
 Hua Guo Shan Temple (士年纳路口花果山), Sedenak, Kulai, Johor
 Hock Siew Kong Temple (麻坡武吉巴西头条福寿宫), Bukit Pasir, Muar, Johor (founded in 1916)
 Fei Lai Tong Temple (飛来洞), Muar, Johor
 Nan Ting Si Temple (麻坡南亭寺), Muar, Johor
 Kerng Tang Kou Bioh Temple (粤东古廟), Muar, Johor
 Tokong Sembilan Maharaja Dewa (龍引斗母宫), Batu Pahat, Johor
 Chong Long Gong Temple (海口石文丁崇龙宫), Batu Pahat, Johor (founded in 1864)
 Lim Sz Chong Su Tian Hou Temple (峇株吧辖林氏宗祠天后宫), Batu Pahat, Johor (founded in 1912)
 Chng Yian Keng Temple (海口石文丁崇岩宫), Batu Pahat, Johor (founded in 1913)
 Tian Hou Gong Temple (峇株吧辖天后宫), Batu Pahat, Johor (founded in 1913)
 Swee Ann Kong Temple (峇株吧辖瑞安宫), Batu Pahat, Johor (founded in 1913)
 Hock Lim Keng Temple (峇株吧辖福林宫), Batu Pahat, Johor (founded in 1915)
 Tokong Kwang Yim Keng (圣模那观音宫兴义殿), Semerah, Batu Pahat, Johor (founded in 1938)
 Si Hai Long Wang Temple (福德坛四海龙王大伯公), Batu Pahat, Johor
 Qi Tian Da Sheng Fu Temple (新加兰路八支齐天大圣府), Senggarang, Batu Pahat, Johor
 Qing Yun Yan Temple (青云嚴), Segamat, Johor
 Sheng Wang Temple (圣王庙), Segamat, Johor
 Kwang Fook Kong Temple (广福宫), Labuan
 Huat Choo Kong Temple (法主宫), Labuan
 Hong San Si Temple (鳳山寺), Kuching, Sarawak (founded in 1848)
 Tua Pek Kong Temple, Kuching, Sarawak
 Hiang Thian Siang Ti Temple (上帝廟), Kuching, Sarawak
 San Ching Tian Temple (美里三清殿), Miri Sarawak
 Tua Pek Kong Temple, Miri Sarawak
 Tua Pek Kong Temple, Sibu, Sarawak
 Jade Dragon Temple (玉龙山天恩寺), Sibu, Sarawak
 Sam Sing Kung Temple(三聖宮), Sandakan, Sabah (founded in 1887)
 Tam Kung Temple (谭公爷庙), Sandakan, Sabah (founded in 1894)
 Peak Nam Toong Temple (碧南堂), Kota Kinabalu, Sabah
 Che Sui Khor Moral Uplifting Society, Kota Kinabalu, Sabah

Gurdwaras (Sikh temple) in Malaysia

Gurudwara Sahib Muar, Johor
Gurudwara Sahib Batu Pahat, Johor
Gurudwara Sahib Segamat, Johor
Gurudwara Sahib Babe ke Guru Ram Das World, Machap, Johor
Gurudwara Sahib Kluang, Johor
Gurudwara Sahib Pontian, Johor
Gurudwara Sahib Johor Bahru, Johor
Gurudwara Sahib Kulim, Kedah
Gurudwara Sahib Sungei Petani, Kedah
Gurudwara Sahib Alor Setar, Kedah
Gurudwara Sahib Khalsa Dharmak Jatha, Penang
Gurudwara Sahib Sikh Police, Penang
Wadda Gurudwara Sahib, Penang
Gurudwara Sahib Perai, Penang
Gurudwara Sahib Butterworth, Penang
Gurudwara Sahib Bukit Mertajam, Penang
Gurudwara Sahib Khalsa Dharmik Sabha, Parit Buntar, Perak
Gurudwara Sahib Pokok Assam, Taiping, Perak
Gurudwara Sahib Taiping, Perak
Gurudwara Sahib Sitiawan, Perak
Gurudwara Sahib Sungei Siput Utara, Perak
Gurudwara Sahib Chemor, Perak
Gurudwara Sahib Kampong Kepayang, Ipoh, Perak
Gurudwara Sahib Tanjong Rambutan, Perak
Gurudwara Sahib Kuala Kangsar, Perak
Gurudwara Shaheed Ganj Sahib, Kaniunting, Perak
Gurudwara Sahib Bruas, Perak
Gurudwara Sahib Bagan Serai, Perak
Gurudwara Sahib Jelapang, Ipoh, Perak
Gurudwara Sahib Sikh Dharmak Sabha, Ipoh, Perak
Gurudwara Sahib Gunong Rapat, Ipoh, Perak
Gurudwara Sahib Buntong, Ipoh, Perak
Gurudwara Sahib Tambun, Ipoh, Perak
Gurudwara Sahib Menglembu Regrouping Area, Ipoh, Perak
Gurudwara Sahib Lahat, Ipoh, Perak
Gurudwara Sahib Gopeng, Perak
Gurudwara Sahib Malim Nawar, Perak
Gurudwara Sahib Tanjong Tuallang, Perak
Gurudwara Sahib Changkat Tin, Perak
Gurudwara Sahib Ayer Papan, Perak
Gurudwara Sahib Tronoh, Perak
Gurudwara Sahib Pusing, Perak
Gurudwara Sahib Siputeh, Ipoh, Perak
Gurudwara Sahib Menglembu, Jalan Lahat, Ipoh, Perak
Gurudwara Sahib Bercham, Ipoh, Perak
Gurudwara Sahib Greentown, Ipoh, Perak
Gurudwara Sahib Kampar, Perak
Gurudwara Sahib Teluk Intan, Perak
Gurudwara Sahib Slim River, Perak
Gurudwara Sahib Changkat, Batu Gajah, Perak
Gurudwara Sahib Batu Gujah, Perak
Gurudwara Sahib Sri Guru Singh Sabha, Gopeng, Perak
Gurudwara Sahib Malay States Guide, Taiping, Perak
Gurudwara Sahib Police, Ipoh, Perak
Gurudwara Sahib Tanjong Malim, Perak
Gurudwara Sahib Bidor, Perak
Gurudwara Sahib Tapah, Perak
Gurudwara Sahib Tronoh Mines, Kampar, Perak
Gurudwara Sahib Tumpat, Kelantan
Gurudwara Sahib Kota Bahru, Kelantan
Gurudwara Sahib Kuala Krai, Kelantan
Gurudwara Sahib Kangar, Perlis
Gurudwara Sahib Malacca
Gurudwara Sahib Dharamsala, Kuala Lumpur
Wadda Gurudwara Sahib Jalan Kampung, Kuala Lumpur
Gurudwara Sahib Jalan Sungai Besi, Kuala Lumpur
Gurudwara Sahib Jinjang, Kuala Lumpur
Gurudwara Sahib Kampung Pandan Settlement, Kuala Lumpur
Gurudwara Sahib Kuyow, Kuala Lumpur
Gurudwara Sahib Mainduab, Kuala Lumpur
Gurudwara Sahib Police, Kuala Lumpur
Gurudwara Sahib Police Depot, Kuala Lumpur
Gurudwara Sahib Police Jalan Parliament, Kuala Lumpur
Gurudwara Sahib Central Workshops Sentul, Kuala Lumpur
Gurudwara Nanak Darbar Tatt Khalsa, Kuala Lumpur, Malaysia
Gurudwara Sahib, Titiwangsa Kuala Lumpur, Malaysia
Gurudwara Sahib Majha Diwan Malaya
Gurudwara Sahib Brickfields, Kuala Lumpur
Gurudwara Sahib Singh Sabha, Lahad Datu, Sabah
Gurudwara Sahib Labuan, Sabah
Gurudwara Sahib Tawau, Sabah
Gurudwara Sahib Kota Kinabalu, Sabah
Gurudwara Sahib Sandakan, Sabah
Gurudwara Sahib Kuching, Sarawak
Gurudwara Sahib Sibu, Sarawak
Gurudwara Sahib Bau, Sarawak
Gurudwara Sahib Miri, Sarawak
Gurudwara Sahib Mantin, Negeri Sembilan
Gurudwara Sahib Kuala Klavang, Jelebu, Negeri Sembilan
Gurudwara Sahib Port Dickson, Negeri Sembilan
Gurudwara Sahib Seremban, Negeri Sembilan
Gurudwara Sahib Kuala Pilah, Negeri Sembilan
Gurudwara Sahib Tampin, Negeri Sembilan
Gurudwara Sahib Kalumpang, Selangor
Gurudwara Sahib Kuala Kubu Baru, SelangorGurudwara Sahib Berjuntai Tin, Selangor
Gurudwara Sahib Klang, Selangor
Gurudwara Sahib Shah Alam, Selangor
Gurudwara Sahib Lembah Jaya, Ampang, Selangor
Gurudwara Sahib Kajang, Selangor
Gurudwara Sahib Batu Arang, Selangor
Gurudwara Sahib Ampang, Selangor
Gurudwara Sahib Guru Ram Das, Banting, Selangor
Gurudwara Sahib Bukit Beruntung, Selangor
Gurudwara Sahib Brinchang, Cameron Highlands, Pahang
Gurudwara Sahib Bentong, Pahang
Gurudwara Sahib Kuala Lipis, Pahang
Gurudwara Sahib Tanah Rata, Pahang
Gurudwara Sahib Raub, Pahang
Gurudwara Sahib Mentakab, Pahang
Gurudwara Sahib (Sikh Temple)

Power stations in Malaysia

 Tuanku Jaafar Power Station

Railway stations in Malaysia
 Kuala Lumpur Railway Station
 Kuala Lumpur Sentral
Penang Sentral

Restaurants in Malaysia
 Huizu Hot Wok - Halal Chinese Restaurant
 Dôme
 Hawker centre
 KLG
 Kelana Seafood Centre
 Kopi tiam
 Mamak stall
 Marrybrown
 Restoran Anjung Warisan
 Restoran Singgah Selalu
 Sate Kajang Haji Samuri
 Secret Recipe
 The Chicken Rice Shop
 Yoshinoya
 KFC
 McDonald's
 Old Town White Coffee
 Papa John Pizza
 Burger King
 Bestfellow Cafe
 Sunshine Bakery & Cafe

Royal residences in Malaysia
 Istana Negara

Shopping malls in Malaysia

Shopping malls in Kuala Lumpur 
 1 Mont Kiara
163 Retail Park
Ampang Park Shopping Complex
Avenue K Shopping Mall
Bangsar Shopping Centre
Bangsar Village
 Berjaya Times Square
 Damansara City Mall (DC Mall)
Fahrenheit 88
Great Eastern Mall
KL East Mall
KL Eco City Mall
KL Gateway Mall
Lot 10
 Low Yat Plaza
 Mid Valley Megamall
 Mitsui Shopping Park LaLaport Bukit Bintang City Centre
MyTown Shopping Centre
NU Sentral
 Pavilion Kuala Lumpur
 Pavilion Bukit Jalil
Pearl Point Shopping Centre
Publika Shopping Gallery
Quill City Mall
 Starhill Gallery (The Starhill)
Sungei Wang Plaza
Sunway Putra Mall
Sunway Velocity Mall
 Suria KLCC
 The Gardens Mall
The Scott Garden
 The Weld

Shopping malls in Selangor 

 1 Utama
 3 Damansara Shopping Mall (formerly Tropicana City Mall) 
ÆON Bukit Tinggi 
 Amcorp Mall
 Atria Shopping Gallery
 Bukit Raja Shopping Centre
 Da Men Mall
 Empire Shopping Gallery
 Gateway@KLIA2
 IOI Mall Puchong
 IPC Shopping Centre
 Jaya One
Jaya Shopping Centre
Klang Parade
Main Place Mall
Mitsui Outlet Park KLIA Sepang
One City Mall
Paradigm Mall
Subang Parade
Summit USJ
Sunway Giza Mall
Sunway Pyramid
The Curve
The Mines Shopping Mall
The Starling Mall

Shopping malls in Perak 

 ÆON MALL Ipoh Klebang
 ÆON MALL Ipoh Station 18
 ÆON MALL Kinta City
 ÆON Midtown Falim Shopping Centre
 Ipoh Parade

Shopping malls in Penang 

 Design Village
Gurney Paragon Mall
 Gurney Plaza
 Island Plaza
 Penang Times Square
 Queensbay Mall

Shopping malls in Johor
ÆON Bukit Indah Shopping Centre
Johor Bahru City Square
Johor Premium Outlets
 Plaza Angsana
 Tebrau City
 Plaza Pelangi
 Pelangi Leisure Mall

Shopping malls in Kedah 

 Aman Central
Kulim Landmark Central

Shopping malls in Kelantan
 KB Mall
 Kota Sri Mutiara Complex
 KBTC Kota Bharu Trade Centre
 Pelangi Mall
 Intan Plaza
 Tesco Mall Kota Bharu

Shopping malls in Sarawak
 ÆON Mall Kuching Central
 Boulevard Shopping Mall
Green Heights Mall
 Hock Lee Center
 One Tuah Jili
 Riverside Shopping Complex
Sarawak Plaza
The Spring Mall
 Tun Jugah
 Wisma Saberkas

Skyscrapers in Malaysia
 KOMTAR
 Menara Telekom
 Petronas Twin Towers
 Plaza Rakyat
 Kuala Lumpur Tower
 Tun Mustapha Tower
The Exchange 106
 Alor Setar Tower
 Mutiara Tower, Kota Bharu
Merdeka 118
 Wisma Sanyan, Sibu
 Sabah State Administrative Centre, Kota Kinabalu

Sports venues in Malaysia
 Bukit Kiara Sports Complex
 Kompleks Sukan Negara
 Malaysia National Hockey Stadium
 National Stadium, Bukit Jalil
 Penang International Sports Arena
 Putra Indoor Stadium
 Shah Alam Stadium
 Stadium Merdeka
 Olympic Council of Malaysia Indoor Sports Centre
 Darulaman Stadium
 Sultan Mizan Zainal Abidin Stadium

Football venues in Malaysia

 City Stadium (Penang)
 DBI Stadium
 Darulaman Stadium
 Darulmakmur Stadium
 Hang Jebat Stadium
 Hang Tuah Stadium
 Likas Stadium
 MPPJ Stadium
 Stadium Merdeka
 National Stadium, Bukit Jalil
 Negeri Pulau Pinang Stadium
 Perak Stadium
 Sarawak Stadium
 Shah Alam Stadium
 Sultan Mohammad IV Stadium
 Tan Sri Hassan Yunus Stadium
 Tuanku Abdul Rahman Stadium
 Utama Stadium

Kompleks Sukan Negara
 Kompleks Sukan Negara
 Malaysia National Hockey Stadium
 National Stadium, Bukit Jalil
 Putra Indoor Stadium
 Bukit Kiara

State Secretariat Buildings in Malaysia
 Kota Darul Naim
 Melaka State Secretriat Building
 Penang State Assembly Building
 Sultan Ibrahim Building
 Sultan Salahuddin Abdul Aziz Shah Building
 Template:Malaysian state secretariat buildings
 Wisma Bapa Malaysia
 Wisma Darul Iman
 Wisma Darul Aman
 Wisma Darul Iman
 Bangunan Darul Ridzuan

Towers in Malaysia
 Kerinchi Pylon
 Kuala Lumpur Tower
 RTM Tower
 Kuala Lumpur City Centre
 Alor Setar Tower

Zoos in Malaysia
 A Famosa Wildlife Safari
 Kuala Krai Mini Zoo
 Kuala Lumpur Bird Park
 Malacca Zoo
 Taiping Zoo
 National Zoo of Malaysia (Zoo Negara)
 Lok Kawi Zoo

Communications in Malaysia
 Blogs Malaysia
 Broadcasting in Malaysia
 Communications in Malaysia
 History of communications in Malaysia
 List of postal codes in Malaysia
 Malaysian Communications and Multimedia Commission
 Postage stamps and postal history of Malaysia
 Postage stamps and postal history of the Straits Settlements
 List of people on stamps of Malaysia

Malaysian culture
 Culture of Malaysia
 Ah Beng
 Ah Lian
 Cuisine of Malaysia
 Datuk Keramat
 DeepaRaya
 Federal star
 Festivals of Malaysia
 Wesak Day
 Flag of Malaysia
 Flag of Sarawak
 Gawai Dayak
 Ghost Festival in Malaysia
 Hari Raya
 Holidays in Malaysia
 Kaamatan
 Keling
 Kiasi
 Kiasu
 Kongsi Raya
 List of Malaysian stamps
 Malay titles
 Malaysian folk religion
 Miss Malaysia
 Negaraku
 Nine Emperor Gods (Perayaan Dewa Sembilan Maharaja)
 Na Tuk Kong
 Pasar malam
 Pasar pagi
 Culture of Penang
 Religious goods store
 Rukunegara
 Sepet
 Silat
 Snake charming
 Snake Temple
 Terengganu State Anthem
 Tomoi
 Vasakhi
 Wesak

Malaysian architecture

Malaysian Art 

 Malaysian Batik

Cinema of Malaysia
 Cinema of Malaysia
 Cathay Organisation
 Golden Screen Cinemas
TGV Cinemas
MBO Cinemas
 List of cinemas in Malaysia

Malaysian actors and Actress
 Abby Abadi
 Sharifah Amani
 Kasma Booty
 Kavita Sidhu
 Angelica Lee Sin Je
 Awie
 Aziz M. Osman
 Angie Cheung
 Erra Fazira
 Fasha Sandha
 Tiara Jacquelina
 Jalaluddin Hassan
 Jamal Abdillah
 Misha Omar
 Hani Mohsin
 M. Nasir
 P. Ramlee
 Rosyam Nor
 Saiful Apek
 Nicholas Teo
 Michelle Yeoh
 Jasmine Michael
 C. Kumaresan
 Acapan
 AMR Murugesan
 AMR Perumal
 Koya Maniam
 S.Ghana
 Nandu Ramesh
 Raji Simran
 Roman Anthony
 Agoendran

Malaysian film directors
 P. Ramlee
 Yasmin Ahmad
 Yusuf Haslam
 Razak Mohaideen
 Afdlin Shauki
 Francis Silvan
 Suhan
 MS Kalai
 Bani
 N.S. Krishna
 Muralikrishnan
 Shan
 Santosh Kesavan

Malaysian films
 Cicak-Man
 Cicak-Man 2 : Planet Hitam
 Leftenan Adnan (film)
 Puteri Gunung Ledang (film)
 Sepet
 Gubra
 Aandal
 Manjari
 Athma
 November 24
The Kid From The Big Apple
The Kid From The Big Apple 2: Before We Forget
Ola Bola
Lee Chong Wei (film)

Malay culture
 Adat
 Alfuros
 Badang
 Bangsawan
 Bawang Putih Bawang Merah
 Bendahara
 Bisan
 Bomoh
 Burung Petala Processions
 Cape Malays
 Datuk Keramat
 Dondang Sayang
 Dukun
 Gangga Negara
 Hang Jebat
 Hang Nadim
 Hang Tuah
 Hari Raya
 History of Dikir Barat
 Jenglot
 Kejawèn
 Kertok
 Kota Gelanggi
 Kuda Kepang
 Laksamana
 Legend of Puteri Gunung Ledang
 Mak yong
 Malay gamelan
 Makam Mahsuri
 Malay Ruler
 Malay ghost myths
 Malay houses
 Malay titles
 Malay world
 Manananggal
 Menora (dance)
 Merong Mahawangsa
 Nasi lemak
 Orang Bunian
 Orang Minyak
 Pantun
 Pawang
 Pontianak (folklore)
 Ronggeng
 Sang Nila Utama
 Satay
 Sepak Takraw
 Sosatie
 Sri Maharaja Sang Sapurba Paduka Sri Trimurti Tri Buana
 Sri Wikrama Wira
 Sri Rana Wikrama
 Sri Maharaja
 Tajul muluk
 Taming Sari
 Temenggung
 Toyol
 Ulek mayang
 Wayang
 Wayang kulit

Malaysian cuisine

Chinese cuisine
 Bak kut teh (肉骨茶)
 Bakkwa
 Ban mian
 Bean Sprouts Chicken (芽菜雞)
 Bee Tai Mak (米苔目)
 Chai tow kway (菜頭粿)
 Char kway teow (炒粿條)
 Char siew rice
 Char siu
 Chee cheong fun (豬腸粉)
 Chicken Rice Ball
 Chinese sausage
 Chwee kueh
 Claypot chicken rice (砂煲飯)
 Curry
 Curry Mee (咖喱面)
 Dim sum (点心)
 Douhua (豆花)
 Duck soup noodles
 Fish ball
 Heong Peng (香餅)
 Hokkien mee (福建麵)
 Kaya toast
 Kolo mee
 Lo mai gai
 Lor bak (鹵肉)
 Lor mee (鹵麵) 
 Ngo hiang (五香)
 Oyster omelette (蚵煎) - "Oh Chien" in Hokkien
 Popiah (薄餅)
 Sar Hor Fun (沙河粉)
 Wonton Mee (雲吞面)
 Yong tau foo (酿豆腐)
 Youtiao (油條)  - "Eu char kuih" in Hokkien and "Yau Zha Gwai" in Cantonese
 Zongzi - "Bak Chang" in Hokkien

Malay cuisine
 Budu
 Candlenut
 Nasi Lemak
 Dodol

Indian cuisine
 Acar
 Banana leaf rice
 Chapati
 Chendol

General cuisine

 Chilli padi
 Cincalok
 Cokodok
 Durian
 Grass jelly
 Gula melaka
 Hainanese chicken rice
 Hawker centre
 Hokkien mee
 Ice kachang
 Ikan Bakar
 Ipoh cuisine
 Ipoh white coffee
 Kaya (jam)
 Keropok
 Ketupat
 Kopi tiam
 Kuih
 Laksa
 Lor mee
 Maggi
 Maggi goreng
 Maggi noodles
 Mamak stall
 Mamee
 Mee Goreng
 Mee pok
 Mee rebus
 Mee siam
 Mung bean
 Nasi Dagang
 Nasi Kandar
 Nasi lemak
 Nonya Food
 Otak-otak
 Palm wine
 Pasembur
 Penang cuisine
 Pisang goreng
 Popiah
 Putu Mayam
 Ramly Burger
 Ramuan
 Rendang
 Rojak
 Roti Tissue
 Roti canai
 Sambal
 Sata
 Satay
 Shrimp paste
 Sup Kambing
 Teh tarik
 Tuak
 Yam Cake
 Yusheng

Festivals in Malaysia

Sports festivals hosted in Malaysia

 1998 Commonwealth Games
 Malaysian F1 Grand Prix
 Malaysia MotoGP Grand Prix
 Monsoon Cup

Flags of Malaysia
 Flag of Malaysia
 Flag of Kuala Lumpur
 State flags in Malaysia

Languages of Malaysia

 Amoy language
 Aslian languages
 Baba Malay
 Buginese language
 Cantonese language
 Eastern Min
 Fuzhou language
 Hakka language
 Iban language
 Jahaic languages
 Javanese language
 Kadazan
 Kod Tangan Bahasa Malaysia
 Kristang language
 Malaysian English
 Malaysian Mandarin
 Malaysian Sign Language
 Manglish
 Minangkabau language
 Negeri Sembilan Malay language
 Penang Hokkien
 Penang Sign Language
 Punjabi Language
 Quanzhou language
 Rojak Language
 Southern Malaysian Hokkien
 Southern Thai language
 Sinhala language
 Tamil language
 Selangor Sign Language
 Semai language
 Yongchun language
 Zhangzhou language

Malaysian literature
 The Malay Dilemma

Malay literature
 Hikayat Banjar
 Hikayat Bayan Budiman
 Hikayat Hang Tuah
 Hikayat Iskandar Zulkarnain
 Hikayat Merong Mahawangsa
 List of Hikayat
 Sejarah Melayu
 Tuhfat al-Nafis

Malaysian mythology
 Tua Pek Kong
 Na Tuk Kong
 Malaysian folk religion
 Datuk Keramat
 Dukun
 Pawang
 Bomoh
 Bisan
 Orang Bunian
 Walinong Sari
 Seri Gumum Dragon
 Badang
 Seri Pahang
 Sang Kelembai
 Taming Sari
 Hantu Demon
 Legend of Gunung Ledang
 Pontianak (folklore)

Malaysian music
 Dangdut
 Malay gamelan
 Music of Malaysia
 Allah Lanjutkan Usia Sultan
 Boria
 Dikir barat
 Malaysian Idol
 Malaysian Philharmonic Orchestra
 Akademi Fantasia
 One in a Million (Malaysian TV series)
 Puteri Gunung Ledang (musical)
 Malaysian Secondary School Band Competition

Malaysian singers
 Ah Niu
 Alvin Anthons
 Awie
 Che'Nelle
 Daniel Lee Chee Hun
 Dayang Nurfaizah
 Erra Fazira
 Faizal Tahir
 Fish Leong
 Guang Liang
 Guy Sebastian
 Imee Ooi
 Ismail Haron & the Guys
 Jaclyn Victor
 Jamal Abdillah
 KRU
 Liu Jun Er (劉珺兒)
 Mawi
 Misha Omar
 M. Nasir
 Nana af
 Nicholas Teo
 Nicolette Palikat
 Ning Baizura
 Penny Tai
 Siti Nurhaliza
 Stacy AF6
 Sudirman Arshad
 Yuna
 Tree In Heaven (3ih)
 Vinx Lin Yi Xin
 Wang Deqing
 Zee Avi
 Ziana Zain
 Z-Chen

Malaysian styles of music
 Malaysian hip hop
 Malaysian Indie Music

Religion in Malaysia
 Buddhism in Malaysia
 Malaysian Theravada
 Malaysian Chinese religion
 Malaysian folk religion
 Chinese ritual mastery traditions
 Celestial God
 God of Prosperity
 Tua Pek Kong
 Di Zhu God
 Datuk Keramat
 Na Tuk Kong
 Religious goods store
 Momolianism
 Status of religious freedom in Malaysia
 Taoism in Malaysia
 Hinduism in Malaysia
 Islam in Malaysia
 Christianity in Malaysia
 Church of the Province of South East Asia
 Methodist Church in Malaysia
 Roman Catholicism in Malaysia
 Sikhism

Sabahan culture
 Nunuk Ragang
 Bobohizan
 Kaamatan

Sport in Malaysia
 Olympic Council of Malaysia
 2001 Men's Champions Challenge (field hockey)
 1993 Men's Champions Trophy (field hockey)
 Le Tour de Langkawi
 Malaysia Chess Federation
 Malaysia at the 1998 Commonwealth Games
 Malaysia at the 2006 Commonwealth Games
 Malaysian cricket team
 Malaysia national amateur boxing athletes
 Sukma Games
 Monsoon Cup

Silat
Pencak Silat is the official name used to indicate more than 800 martial arts schools and styles spread across more than 18,000 islands in Indonesia. Pencak Silat is popular throughout Southeast Asia, include in Malaysia.
 Gayung Fatani
 Silat Cekak Hanafi
 Gayung Malaysia
 Kateda
 Kuntao Silat
 Liu Seong Kuntao
 Paul de Thouars

Football in Malaysia
 2004 Tiger Cup
 Football Association of Malaysia
 Malaysia national football team
 Perak football team
 Malaysian Premier League
 Malaysian Super League

Malaysian football clubs
 KL Plus FC
 Kedah FA
 Negri Sembilan FA
 Pahang FA
 Perak FA
 Perlis FA
 Selangor FA
 Penang FA
 Kelantan FA

Malaysian football competitions
 Malaysia Cup
 Malaysian Premier League
 Malaysian Super League

Sailing in Malaysia
Raja Muda Selangor International Regatta
Royal Langkawi International Regatta

Malaysian Sailors
 Dato' Azhar Mansor

Golf in Malaysia

Golf tournaments in Malaysia
 CIMB Classic
 Colgate Far East Open
 EurAsia Cup
 Iskandar Johor Open
 Malaysian Dunlop Masters
 Malaysian Masters
 Malaysian Open (golf)
 Maybank Championship
 PGM Sime Darby Harvard Championship
 Pulai Springs Malaysian Masters
 Sabah Masters
 Sarawak Championship
 Selangor Masters
 Sime Darby LPGA Malaysia
 Volvo Masters of Asia
 Volvo Masters of Malaysia

Malaysian golfers
 Danny Chia
 Jean Chua
 Nicholas Fung
 Gavin Green
 Periasamy Gunasegaran
 Arie Irawan
 Michelle Koh
 Ben Leong
 Marimuthu Ramayah
 Airil Rizman
 Iain Steel
 Kelly Tan

Sport in Kuala Lumpur
KL International Inter City Kabaddi Championships

Le Tour de Langkawi
 Le Tour de Langkawi
 2000 Le Tour de Langkawi
 2001 Le Tour de Langkawi
 2002 Le Tour de Langkawi
 2003 Le Tour de Langkawi
 2004 Le Tour de Langkawi
 2005 Le Tour de Langkawi
 2006 Le Tour de Langkawi

Malaysian Grand Prix
 1999 Malaysian Grand Prix
 2000 Malaysian Grand Prix
 2001 Malaysian Grand Prix
 2002 Malaysian Grand Prix
 2003 Malaysian Grand Prix
 2004 Malaysian Grand Prix
 2005 Malaysian Grand Prix
 2006 Malaysian Grand Prix
 Malaysian Grand Prix
 Sepang International Circuit

Malaysia at the Olympics
 Malaysia at the 1972 Summer Olympics
 Malaysia at the 1988 Summer Olympics
 Malaysia at the 1992 Summer Olympics
 Malaysia at the 1996 Summer Olympics
 Malaysia at the 2000 Summer Olympics
 Malaysia at the 2004 Summer Olympics

Olympic competitors for Malaysia
 Chan Chong Ming
 Choong Tan Fook
 Wong Choong Hann
 Lee Chong Wei

Weapons of Malaysia
 Parang
 Keris

Malayan swords
 Kampilan
 Klewang
 Kris

Malaysian writers

 Tash Aw
 Abdullah bin Abdul Kadir
 Kee Thuan Chye
 Keris Mas
 Jeff Ooi
 Oon Yeoh
 Peter Pek
 Syed Hussein Alatas
 Syed Muhammad Naquib al-Attas
 Lillian Too
 Mack Zulkifli

Economy of Malaysia
 Economy of Malaysia
 Bank Negara Malaysia
 BioValley
 FELDA
 Hawker centre
 Iskandar Development Region
 Islamic banking in Malaysia
 Kuala Lumpur Commodity Exchange
 Kuala Lumpur Composite Index
KL Metropolis
 Malaysia Derivatives Exchange
 Malaysian Industrial Development Authority
 Malaysian ringgit
 Malay units of measurement
 MSC Malaysia
 MyKad
 National Grid, Malaysia
 Northern Corridor Economic Region
 Remisier
Tun Razak Exchange (TRX)
 Urban Development Authority

Malaysian businesspeople
 Tan Hiok Nee
 Chung Keng Quee
 Wong Ah Fook
 Tan Chay Yan
 Tan Sri Dato' Seri Dr. Jeffrey Cheah
 Tan Sri William Cheng
 Zang Toi
 Jimmy Choo
 Melinda Looi
 Bernard Chandran
 Daim Zainuddin
 Halim Saad
 Ananda Krishnan
 Robert Kuok
 Tan Sri Mohd Saleh bin Sulong
 Peter Pek
 Shoba Purushothaman
 Quek Leng Chan
 Nasimuddin Amin
 Tan Sri Syed Mokhtar Al-Bukhary
 Vincent Tan
 Teh Hong Piow
 Tiong Hiew King
 Lim Goh Tong
 Lim Kok Thay
 Tony Fernandes
 Lillian Too
 Yeoh Tiong Lay
 TC Ooi

Companies of Malaysia
 
 AirAsia
 Asiaep
 Astro (satellite TV)
 BSA Manufacturing
 Berjaya Group
 Boustead Group
 Bufori
 Bursa Malaysia
 City-Link Express
 Centada
 DK Leather
 DRB-HICOM
 DiGi Telecommunications
 EON Berhad
 Ezyfocus
 Gamuda Berhad
 Genting Group
 German Business Pool
 Golden Hope
 Guthrie (Malaysia)
 IOI Group
 Imaginative Illusions Sdn. Bhd.
 Inokom
 Jaring
 Jobstreet
 KLCC Properties
 Khazanah Nasional
 Kinta Kellas
 Kuala Lumpur Kepong Berhad
 Kulim (Malaysia) Berhad
 Lam Eng Rubber
 Lion Group
 MIMOS
 MUI Group
 Malaysia Airlines
 Malaysian International Shipping Corporation
 Malaysian Rubber Board
 Maxis Communications
 Media Prima Berhad
 Modenas
 NasionCom
 Naza
 Netccentric
 OYL Industries Berhad
 Oriental Holdings
 Pensonic Group
 Perodua
 Petronas
 Proton (company)
 Ramly Burger
 Resorts World Bhd
 Road Builder
 Royal Selangor
 S P Setia
 Sabah Air
 Scientex Incorporated Berhad
 Sime Darby
 Star Cruises
 Sunway Group
 Supermax (Malaysia)
 Syarikat Prasarana Negara Berhad
 TD2000
 Tigas
 TM Net
 TM Research And Development
 TSH Ekowood
 Tanjong
 Telekom Malaysia
 Tenaga Nasional
 Tender Direct Sdn Bhd
 The Lion Group
 UEM Group
 Uchi Technologies Berhad
 Urban Development Authority
 VADS
 YTL Corporation

Motor vehicle manufacturers of Malaysia
 Bufori
 Inokom
 Naza
 Perodua
 Proton (company)
 TD2000

Banks of Malaysia
 Affin Bank
 Bank Islam Malaysia
 Bank Muamalat Malaysia
 Bank Negara Malaysia
 Bumiputra-Commerce Holdings
 Malaysian Electronic Payment System
 Maybank
 Public Bank
 Southern Bank
 AmBank

Mobile phone companies of Malaysia
 Celcom Berhad
 DiGi Telecommunications
 Maxis Communications
 Telekom Malaysia
 U Mobile

Celcom
 Celcom Berhad
 Celcom Minutes
 Celcom Blue
 Xpax

Maxis
 Maxis Communications
 Hotlink

TM Group of Companies
 Celcom Berhad
 Dialog Telekom
 Menara Alor Star
 TM Net
 TM Research And Development
 Telekom Malaysia
 VADS (IT company)

Economic history of Malaysia
 1997 Asian financial crisis
 British North Borneo dollar
 Eleventh Malaysia Plan
 First Malayan Five Year Plan
 First Malaysia Plan
 Malaya and British Borneo dollar
 Malayan dollar
 Malaysian New Economic Policy
 National Development Policy
 Ninth Malaysia Plan
 Sarawak dollar
 Second Malayan Five Year Plan
 Second Malaysia Plan
 Straits dollar
 Tenth Malaysia Plan
Twelfth Malaysia Plan

Ports and harbours of Malaysia
 Johor Port
 Port Klang
 Tanjung Langsat Port
 Port of Tanjung Pelepas
 West Port
 Lumut
 Penang Port

Ports and harbours of Sabah

Trade unions of Malaysia
 Congress of Unions of Employees in the Public and Civil Services
 Trade Unions in Malaysia
 Malaysian Trades Union Congress
 National Council of Unions of the Industrial and Lower Income Group of Government Workers

Water supply and Sanitation in Malaysia 
 Water supply and Sanitation in Malaysia

Education in Malaysia

Schools in Malaysia

Universities and colleges in Malaysia

Environment of Malaysia

Biota of Malaysia

Fauna of Malaysia
 Asian elephant
 Asian water monitor
 Asiatic black bear
 Asiatic golden cat
 Banteng
 Bay cat
 Bengal monitor
 Black bittern
 Black stork
 Black-crowned night heron
 Black-headed ibis
 Black-necked stork
 Blood python
 Bulwer's pheasant
 Burmese python
 Cattle egret
 Chinese egret
 Chinese pond heron
 Cinnamon bittern
 Clouded leopard
 Crested argus
 Crested wood partridge
 Croaking gourami
 Dhole
 Dugong
 False gharial
 Fishing cat
 Flat-headed cat
 Gaur
 Giant gourami
 Glossy ibis
 Great cormorant
 Great crested grebe
 Great egret
 Great hornbill
 Greater adjutant
 Green sea turtle
 Grey heron
 Hawksbill turtle
 Helmeted hornbill
 Indian pond heron
 Indian muntjac
 Indochinese tiger
 Intermediate egret
 Jambu fruit dove
 Leatherback sea turtle
 Leopard
 Leopard cat
 Lesser adjutant
 Little cormorant
 Little egret
 Little grebe
 Malayan peacock pheasant
 Malayan tapir
 Malayan tiger
 Malayan roundleaf bat
 Malaysian peacock pheasant
 Manouria emys
 Marbled cat
 Mountain peacock pheasant
 Nicobar pigeon
 Nycteridae
 Orangutan
 Oriental darter
 Oriental magpie robin
 Painted stork
 Peacock bass
 Pelochelys cantorii
 Penang betta
 Pied imperial-pigeon
 Pompadour green pigeon
 Proboscis monkey
 Purple heron
 Pygmy gourami
 Reticulated python
 Rhinoceros hornbill
 Rufous-necked hornbill
 Saltwater crocodile
 Sarus crane
 Siamese crocodile
 Striated heron
 Sumatran rhinoceros
 Sun bear
 Tiger
 Trichopodus trichopterus
 Tropidolaemus wagleri
 Water buffalo
 Woolly-necked stork
 Wreathed hornbill
 Wrinkled hornbill
 Yellow bittern
 Yellow-footed green pigeon
 Zebra dove

Flora of Malaysia
 Bamboo orchid
 Dipterocarpus acutangulus
 Dipterocarpus caudatus
 Dipterocarpus confertus
 Dipterocarpus conformis
 Dipterocarpus coriaceus
 Dipterocarpus cornutus
 Dipterocarpus costulatus
 Dipterocarpus crinitus
 Dipterocarpus dyeri
 Dipterocarpus elongatus
 Dipterocarpus eurynchus
 Dipterocarpus geniculatus
 Dipterocarpus glabrigemmatus
 Dipterocarpus globosus
 Dipterocarpus gracilis
 Dipterocarpus hasseltii
 Dipterocarpus humeratus
 Dipterocarpus kerrii
 Dipterocarpus lamellatus
 Dipterocarpus ochraceus
 Dipterocarpus retusus
 Dipterocarpus sarawakensis
 Dipterocarpus semivestitus
 Dipterocarpus validus
 Dipterocarpus verrucosus
 Nepenthes rajah
 Rafflesia arnoldii
 Rafflesia kerrii

Conservation in Malaysia
 Danum Valley Conservation Area
 Department of Wildlife and National Parks
 Kota Kinabalu City Bird Sanctuary
 Sabah Parks
 Sugud Islands Marine Conservation Area
 Wild Asia
 Wildlife Conservation Enactment

World Heritage Sites (UNESCO) in Malaysia
 George Town, Penang
 Gunung Mulu National Park
 Kinabalu National Park
 Melaka
 Mount Kinabalu
 Poring Hotspring
 Langkawi Marine Park

Geography of Malaysia
 Geography of Malaysia
 Borneo
 Bukit Cina
 Bukit Larut
 Bukit Tapur
 Bukit Tinggi, Pahang
 Cameron Highlands
 Demographics of Malaysia
 Districts of Malaysia
 East Malaysia
 Gulf of Thailand
 Iskandar Development Region
 ISO 3166-2:MY
 Jelebu
 Klang Valley
 Kuala Muda
 Lombong
 Malaysia–Singapore border
 Malaysia–Thailand barrier
 Malaysia–Thailand border
 Malaysian Standard Time
 Manjung
 MSC Malaysia
 Northernmost tip of Borneo
 Northern Corridor Economic Region
 Penang Hill
 Peninsular Malaysia
 Perak River
 Seberang Perai
 Singapore Strait
 Strait of Malacca
 Straits of Johor
 Sugud Islands Marine Conservation Area
 Ulu Baram

Bays of Malaysia
 Brunei Bay
 Danga Bay

Caves of Malaysia
 Mulu Caves Project
 Api Chamber
 Batu Caves
 Benarat 2005 Expedition
 Gomantong Caves
 Gua Tempurung
 Gunung Mulu National Park
 Niah Caves
 Sarawak Chamber

Cities in Malaysia

 Alor Star
 George Town, Penang
 Ipoh
 Johor Bahru
 Kota Kinabalu
 Kuching
 Kuala Lumpur
 Malacca Town
 Miri
 Sandakan
 Petaling Jaya
 Shah Alam
 Kuala Terengganu
 Sibu

Cities in Sabah
 Kota Kinabalu
 Sandakan

Johor Bahru
 Daerah Sentral Johor Bahru
 Danga Bay
 Johor Bahru
 Johor Bahru District
 Johor Bahru Prison
 Johor Bahru landmarks
 Johor Bahru Old Chinese Temple
 Johor Port
 Legaran Segget
 Masjid Diraja Pasir Pelangi
 Masjid Negeri Sultan Abu Bakar
 Pasir Pelangi
 Port of Tanjung Pelepas
 Southern Integrated Gateway
 Tanjung Langsat Port

Hospitals in Johor Bahru
 Sultan Ismail Hospital

Johor Bahru housing estates
 Century Garden
 Permas Jaya
 Taman Johor Jaya

Towns and suburbs in Johor Bahru District
 Bandar Baru UDA
 Bandar Dato' Onn
 Bandar Baru Permas Jaya
 Bukit Indah
 Gelang Patah
 Kempas
 Kulai
 Masai, Johor
 Pasir Gudang
 Plentong
 Senai
 Setia Indah
 Setia Tropika
 Skudai
 Taman Daya
 Taman Johor Jaya
 Taman Perling
 Taman Universiti
 Tampoi, Johor
 Ulu Tiram

Kuala Lumpur
 Kuala Lumpur
 1998 Commonwealth Games
 Ampang Line
 Bandar Tasik Selatan
 Bandar Tun Razak
 Bangsar
 Batu, Kuala Lumpur
 Berjaya Times Square
 Brickfields
 Buddhist Maha Vihara
 Bukit Bintang
 Bukit Damansara
 Bukit Kiara
 Bukit Kiara Sports Complex
 Bukit Nanas
 Bukit Petaling
 Bursa Malaysia
 Central Market, Malaysia
 Cheras, Kuala Lumpur
 Chow Kit
 Damansara Town Centre
 Dang Wangi
 Dataran Merdeka
 Dayabumi
 Dewan Bandaraya Kuala Lumpur
 Flag of Kuala Lumpur
 Imbi
 International School of Kuala Lumpur
 Istana Budaya
 Istana Negara
 Jinjang
 KLIA Ekspres
 Kampung Baru, Kuala Lumpur
 Kampung Datuk Keramat
 Kampung Kerinchi
 Kelana Jaya Line
 Kepong
 Kerinchi
 Kompleks Sukan Negara
 Kota Darul Ehsan
 Kuala Lumpur General Post Office
 Kuala Lumpur International Airport
 Kuala Lumpur Monorail
 Kuala Lumpur Railway Station
 Kuala Lumpur Sentral
 Kuala Lumpur Tower
 Kuala Lumpurian
 Lembah Pantai
 List of old roads in Kuala Lumpur
 Low Yat Plaza
 Makam Pahlawan
 Malaysian Houses of Parliament
 Masjid Jamek
 Masjid Negara
 Menara Telekom
 Mid Valley Megamall
 Mont Kiara
 Muzium Negara
 National History Museum (Malaysia)
 National Stadium, Bukit Jalil
 P. Ramlee House
 PULAPOL
 Parliament of Malaysia
 Petaling Street
 Petronas Twin Towers
 Puduraya
 Puncak Jalil
 RAF Kuala Lumpur
 Rapid KL
 Rimba ilmu
 Royal Selangor Club
 Segambut
 Semarak
 Sentul, Malaysia
 Seputeh
 Setiawangsa
 Sin Sze Si Ya Temple
 Sri Hartamas
 Sri Petaling
 Sri Petaling Line
 St. John's Institution, Kuala Lumpur
 Stadium Merdeka
 Sultan Abdul Samad Building
 Sungai Besi Airport
 Suria KLCC
 Taman Melawati
 Taman Tun Dr Ismail
 Taman U-Thant
 Thean Hou Temple
 Tugu Negara
 University of Malaya
 Wangsa Maju
 Victoria Institution

Expressways and highways in Klang Valley
 Ampang–Kuala Lumpur Elevated Highway
 Cheras–Kajang Expressway
 Cheras Highway
 Damansara–Puchong Expressway
 East–West Expressway/Salak Expressway
 Federal Highway, Malaysia
 Guthrie Corridor Expressway
 KLIA Expressway
 KLIA Outer Ring Road
 Kajang Dispersal Link Expressway
 Kuala Lumpur Inner Ring Road
 Kuala Lumpur Middle Ring Road 1
 Kuala Lumpur Middle Ring Road 2
 Kuala Lumpur–Rawang Highway
 Kuala Lumpur–Seremban Expressway
 New Klang Valley Expressway
 New North Klang Straits Bypass
 New Pantai Expressway
 North Klang Straits Bypass
 North–South Expressway Central Link
 Puchong–Sungai Besi Highway
 Pulau Indah Expressway
 Putrajaya–Cyberjaya Expressway
 SMART Tunnel
 Shah Alam Expressway
 South Klang Valley Expressway
 Sprint Expressway
 Subang Airport Highway
 Sungai Besi Expressway

Geography of Selangor

Districts of Selangor

 Gombak
 Hulu Langat
 Hulu Selangor
 Klang
 Kuala Langat
 Kuala Selangor
 Sabak Bernam
 Sepang

Petaling

 Petaling, Selangor
 Damansara, Selangor

Islands of Malaysia
 List of islands of Malaysia
 Greater Sunda Islands
 Jerejak
 Kapalai
 Kapas Island
 Labuan
 Lang Tengah Island
 Langkawi
 Lankayan Island
 Ligitan
 Mabul
 Mataking
 Pangkor Island
 Penang
 Perhentian Islands
 Pulau Aman
 Pulau Batu Puteh
 Pulau Besar (Johor)
 Pulau Besar (Malacca)
 Pulau Betong
 Pulau Carey
 Pulau Gedung
 Pulau Indah
 Pulau Ketam
 Pulau Klang
 Pulau Payar
 Pulau Pemanggil
 Pulau Rawa
 Pulau Sibu
 Pulau Tengah
 Pulau Tenggol
 Pulau Tiga
 Pulau Tinggi
 Redang Island
 Sipadan
 Sunda Islands
 Tabawan
 Tioman Island

Islands of Sabah
 Banggi
 Kapalai
 Lankayan Island
 Ligitan
 Mabul
 Mantanani Islands
 Mataking
 Sipadan
 Tabawan
 Timbun Mata

Spratly Islands
 Spratly Islands
 Fiat Island
 James Shoal
 Kalayaan, Palawan
 Kingdom of Humanity
 Loaita Island
 Republic of Morac-Songhrati-Meads
 Sin Cowe Island
 Thitu Island

Maps of the Spratly Islands
 Maps of the Spratly Islands

Geography of Johor
 Bakri, Johor
 Jagoh
 Muar River
 Pasir Pelangi
 Pontian district
 Pontian, Johor
 Pulau Besar (Johor)
 Pulau Rawa
 Pulau Sibu

Towns in Johor
 Air Papan
 Ayer Hitam
 Bakri, Johor
 Bandar Penawar
 Bandar Tenggara
 Batu Enam
 Batu Pahat
 Bekok
 Benut
 Bukit Gambir
 Bukit Kangkar
 Bukit Kepong
 Bukit Naning
 Bukit Pasir
 Buloh Kasap
 Chaah
 Desaru
 Endau
 Jagoh
 Jemaluang
 Jementah
 Johor Lama
 Kahang
 Kampung Minyak Beku
 Kelapa Sawit
 Kluang
 Kong Kong
 Kota Tinggi
 Kukup
 Labis
 Layang-Layang, Johor
 Lenga, Johor
 Machap
 Mengkibol
 Mersing
 Muar
 Pagoh
 Paloh
 Panchor
 Parit Jawa
 Parit Raja
 Parit Sulong
 Parit Yaani
 Pekan Air Panas
 Pekan Nanas
 Pengerang
 Renggam
 Rengit
 Sagil
 Sedenak
 Sedili
 Segamat
 Semerah
 Senggarang (Malaysia)
 Simpang Renggam
 Sri Medan
 Sungai Balang
 Sungai Mati
 Sungai Rengit
 Taman Universiti
 Tangkak
 Tanjung Kupang
 Tanjung Langsat
 Tanjung Leman
 Tanjung Pengelih
 Teluk Mahkota
 Teluk Ramunia
 Tenggaroh
 Tongkang Pechah
 Yong Peng

Segamat
 Bekok
 Buloh Kasap
 Chaah
 Jambatan Buloh Kasap
 Jementah
 Labis
 Pekan Air Panas
 Segamat

Lakes of Malaysia

 Bera Lake
 Chini Lake
 Kenyir Lake
 Putrajaya Lake
 Temenggor Lake
 Pedu Laker

Maps of Malaysia
 Maps of Malaysia

Mountain ranges of Malaysia
 Bintang Mountains
 Crocker Range
 Nakawan Range
 Tanabo Range
 Titiwangsa Mountains

Mountain ranges of Sabah

Mountains of Malaysia
 Bukit Larut
 Genting Highlands
 Gunung Korbu
 Mount Jerai
 Mount Banang
 Mount Kinabalu
 Mount Lambak
 Mount Ma'okil
 Mount Pulai
 Mount Murud
 Mount Nuang
 Bukit Tabur
 Mount Ophir
 Mount Santubong
 Gunung Tahan
 Mount Tambuyukon
 Mount Trus Madi

Mountains of Sabah
 Mount Kinabalu
 Mount Danum

National parks of Malaysia
 List of national parks of Malaysia
 Bako National Park
 Batang Ai National Park
 Crocker Range National Park
 Endau Rompin National Park
 Gunung Mulu National Park
 Kinabalu National Park
 Maludam National Park
 National Parks and Forest Reserves of Johor
 Pulau Tiga National Park
 Taman Negara National Park
 Tawau Hills National Park
 Tunku Abdul Rahman National Park
 Turtle Islands National Park

Towns in Negeri Sembilan
 Bahau
 Batang Benar
 Batu Kikir
 FELDA L.B. Johnson
 Gemas
 Gemencheh
 Johol
 Juasseh
 Kota
 Kuala Klawang
 Kuala Pilah
 Labu
 Lenggeng
 Linggi
 Lukut
 Mambau
 Mantin
 Nilai
 Pajam
 Pasir Panjang
 Pedas
 Pengkalan Kempas
 Port Dickson
 Rantau
 Rembau
 Rompin
 Senawang
 Sepang Road
 Seremban
 Seri Menanti
 Siliau
 Sungai Gadut
 Sungai Muntoh
 Tampin
 Tiroi

Rivers of Malaysia

 Ampang River
 Balleh River
 Balui River
 Bangkit River
 Batu Pahat River
 Bernam River
 Bintangor River
 Damansara River
 Dinding River
 Endau River
 Gombak River
 Igan River
 Johor River
 Katibas River
 Kedah River
 Kelantan River
 Kemaman River
 Kemena River
 Kemensah River
 Kerayong River
 Kerian River
 Kesang River
Kinta River
 Klang River
 Kuantan River
 Kuyoh River
 Langat River
 Linggi River
 Maong River
 Melaka River
 Mengkibol River
 Merbok River
 Mersing River
 Muar River
 Muda River
 Padungan River
 Pahang River
 Penchala River
 Perai River
 Perak River
 Perlis River
 Pelentong River, Johor
 Pelentong River, Negeri Sembilan
 Pulai River
 Rajang River
 Sarang Buaya River
 Sarawak River
 Segget River
 Selangor River
 Skudai River
 Tebrau River
 Tembeling River
 Terengganu River

Rivers of Sabah
 Kinabatangan River
 Liwagu River

Geography of Sabah
 Kundasang Valley
 Pulau Gaya

Towns in Sabah
 Beaufort, Sabah
 Beluran
 Inanam
 Keningau
 Kinabatangan
 Kota Belud
 Kota Marudu
 Kuala Penyu
 Kudat
 Kunak
 Lahad Datu
 Nabawan
 Papar, Sabah
 Penampang
 Pitas, Sabah
 Ranau
 Sandakan
 Semporna
 Sipitang
 Tambunan
 Tamparuli
 Tawau
 Tenom
 Tuaran

Villages in Sabah
 Kundasang
 Sapang

Towns in Kelantan
 Gua Musang
 Jeli
 Kota Bharu
 Bachok
 Pengkalan Kubur
 Pengkalan Chepa
 Rantau Panjang
 Kubang Kerian
 Tumpat
 Pasir Puteh
 Machang
 Kuala Krai
 Pasir Tumboh

Towns in Kedah
 Anak Bukit
 Baling
 Bandar Baharu
 Bedong
 Bukit Kayu Hitam
 Changlun
 Guar Chempedak
 Gurun, Kedah
 Jeniang
 Jitra
 Kodiang
 Kota Sarang Semut
 Kuah
 Kuala Kedah
 Kuala Nerang
 Kulim
 Langgar, Kedah
 Lunas, Kedah
 Merbok
 Padang Matsirat
 Pendang
 Pokok Sena
 Sintok
 Sungai Petani
 Lagenda Height
 Bandar Puteri Jaya
 Amanjaya
 Bandar Darulaman
 Bandar Laguna Merbok
 Mergong

Towns in Malacca
 Alor Gajah
 Ayer Keroh
 Batu Berendam
 Bukit Katil
 Durian Tunggal
 Jasin, Malacca
 Klebang
 Lendu, Malacca
 Lubuk China
 Masjid Tanah
 Nyalas
 Ramuan China
 Selandar
 Serkam
 Sungai Rambai
 Sungai Udang
 Tanjung Bidara
 Tanjung Kling
 Tanjung Tuan
 Umbai

Towns in Pahang
 Bandar Indera Mahkota
 Bandar Muadzam Shah
 Bandar Pusat Jengka
 Bandar Tun Abdul Razak
 Benta
 Bentong
 Beserah
 Brinchang
 Chenor
 Cherating
 Fraser's Hill
 Gambang, Pahang
 Genting Highlands
 Genting Sempah
 Janda Baik
 Jerantut
 Karak, Pahang
 Kuala Lipis
 Kuala Rompin
 Kuantan
 Lanchang
 Maran, Pahang
 Mentakab
 Pekan
 Raub
 Rompin
 Sungai Lembing
 Tanah Rata
 Temerloh
 Teriang

Towns in Penang
 Air Itam
 Bagan Ajam
 Balik Pulau
 Batu Ferringhi
 Batu Kawan
 Batu Maung
 Bayan Lepas
 Bukit Mertajam
 Butterworth, Penang
 Gelugor
 Jawi, Penang
 Jelutong, Penang
 Juru
 Kepala Batas, Penang
 Nibong Tebal
 Pantai Aceh
 Perai
 Permatang Pauh
 Seberang Jaya
 Sungai Bakap
 Sungai Dua
 Tanjung Bungah
 Tanjung Tokong
 Teluk Bahang

Towns in Perak
 Ayer Tawar
 Bagan Datoh
 Bagan Sungai Burong
 Batu Gajah
 Behrang
 Bercham
 Beruas
 Bidor
 Bikam
 Bota
 Bukit Merah, Perak
 Chemor
 Damar Laut
 Gerik
 Gopeng
 Jelapang
 Jenderata
 Kampar, Perak
 Kamunting
 Keroh
 Kuala Kangsar
 Kuala Sepetang
 Lambor Kanan
 Lekir
 Lenggong
 Lumut
 Malim Nawar
 Mambang Di Awan
 Menglembu
 Pantai Remis
 Parit
 Parit Buntar
 Pasir Salak
 Pekan Gurney
 Pengkalan Hulu
 Proton City
 Sayong
 Selama
 Seri Iskandar
 Seri Manjung
 Simpang Pulai
 Simpang Tiga
 Sitiawan
 Slim River
 Slim, Perak
 Sungai Siput
 Sungkai
 Taiping (Perak)
 Tambun
 Tanjung Malim
 Tapah
 Tapah Road
 Teluk Batik
 Teluk Intan
 Teluk Rubiah
 Ternoh
 Terolak
 Terong
 Teronoh
 Tringkap

Towns in Perlis
 Arau
 Kangar
 Kuala Perlis
 Padang Besar, Malaysia
 Beseri
 Chuping
 Wang Kelian

Putrajaya
 Perdana Leadership Foundation
 Putrajaya
 Putrajaya Independence Square
 Putrajaya Wetlands Park
 Taman Selatan

Towns in Sarawak
 Bau, Sarawak
 Belaga, Sarawak
 Betong, Sarawak
 Bintangor, Sarawak
 Bintulu
 Dalat, Sarawak
 Debak, Sarawak
 Julau
 Kanowit
 Kapit
 Lawas
 Limbang
 Lingga, Malaysia
 Lubok Antu
 Lundu, Sarawak
 Marudi, Sarawak
 Mato, Sarawak
 Meradong
 Mukah
 Pusa, Sarawak
 Samarahan
 Saratok
 Sarikei
 Serian, Sarawak
 Sibu
 Song, Sarawak
 Spaoh
 Sri Aman
 Tanjung Kidurong
 Tatau

Towns in Selangor
 Ampang
 Ara Damansara
 Asam Jawa
 Bagan Lalang
 Bagan Nakhoda Omar
 Bandar Baru Selayang
 Bandar Kinrara
 Bandar Sri Damansara
 Bandar Sungai Buaya
 Bandar Sungai Long
 Bandar Utama
 Bangi, Malaysia
 Banting
 Batang Berjuntai
 Batang Kali
 Batu Arang
 Beranang
 Bernam Jaya
 Broga
 Bukit Beruntung
 Bukit Jelutong
 Bukit Raja
 Bukit Rimau
 Bukit Rotan
 Bukit Subang
 Cyberjaya
 Damansara Jaya
 Damansara Utama
 Dengkil
 Ijok
 Jeram
 Jugra
 Kajang
 Kalumpang
 Kampung Pandan
 Kapar
 Kelana Jaya
 Kerling, Selangor
 Klang
 Kota Damansara
 Kota Kemuning
 Kuala Kubu Bharu
 Kuala Selangor
 Kuang
 Lembah Beringin
 Meru, Malaysia
 Morib
 Mutiara Damansara
 Paya Jaras
 Port Klang
 Puchong
 Puncak Alam
 Rasa, Malaysia
 Rawang, Malaysia
 Sabak
 Salak Tinggi
 Sekinchan
 Semenyih
 Sepang
 Serendah
 Setia Alam
 Sijangkang
 Subang
 Subang Jaya
 Sungai Besar
 Sungai Buloh
 Sungai Burong
 Sungai Panjang
 Sungai Pelek
 Tanjung Karang
 Tanjung Sepat
 Teluk Datok
 Teluk Panglima Garang
 UEP Subang Jaya
 Ulu Klang
 Ulu Yam

Towns in Terengganu
 Bandar Al-Muktafi Billah Shah
 Bandar Ketengah Jaya
 Bandar Permaisuri
 Bandar Seri Bandi
 Batu Rakit
 Bukit Besi
 Chukai
 Jerangau
 Jerteh
 Kemasik
 Kerteh
 Kijal
 Kuala Berang
 Kuala Besut
 Kuala Dungun
 Kuala Terengganu
 Paka, Malaysia
 Rantau Abang
 Seberang Takir
 Tanjung Berhala
 Teluk Kalung
 Wakaf Tapai

Villages in Malaysia
 Balakong, Selangor
 Cherok Tok Kun, Penang
 Jenjarom, Selangor
 Kampung Balai, Kelantan
 Kampung Tengah, Johor
 Kampung Tok'kong (赤脚村), Kelantan
 Kerinchi
 Machang Bubok, Penang
 Salang, Malaysia
 Sapang
 Seri Kembangan
 Tanjung Gemuk

Waterfalls of Malaysia
 Berkelah falls
 Cemerung Falls
 Chiling waterfalls
 Gabai Falls
 Kanching Falls
 Kota Tinggi Waterfalls
 Mahua Waterfall
 Maliau Falls
 Takob Akob Falls

Government of Malaysia
 Article 153 of the Constitution of Malaysia
 Article 160 of the Constitution of Malaysia
 Cabinet of Malaysia
 Chief Whip (Malaysia)
 Civil Service in Malaysia
 Constitution of Malaysia
 Courts of Malaysia
 Department of Wildlife and National Parks
 Dewan Negara
 Dewan Rakyat
 Election Commission of Malaysia
 Forest Research Institute Malaysia
 National Institute of Public Administration (Malaysia)
 Khazanah Nasional
 List of leaders of Malaysian states
 Majlis Amanah Rakyat
 Malay states
 Malaysian Industrial Development Authority
 Malaysian Maritime Enforcement Agency
 Malaysian Maritime Enforcement Agency Act 2004
 Malaysian Public Works Department
 Malaysian Road Transport Department
 Menteri Besar
 Parliament of Malaysia
 Sabah Parks
 Speaker of the Dewan Rakyat
 Malaysian Special Branch
 Syarikat Prasarana Negara Berhad
 Tourism Malaysia
 Yang di-Pertuan Agong

Deputy Prime Ministers of Malaysia
 Tun Abdul Razak
 Anwar Ibrahim
 Ghafar Baba
 Abdullah Ahmad Badawi
 Hussein Onn
 Mahathir bin Mohamad
 Musa Hitam
 Najib Tun Razak
 Ismail Abdul Rahman

Foreign relations of Malaysia
 Foreign relations of Malaysia
 Anglo-Malayan Defence Agreement
 Embassy of Malaysia in Washington
 Five Power Defence Arrangements
 Malaysia-Singapore Points of Agreement of 1990
 List of High Commissioners from New Zealand to Malaysia
 Sabah dispute
 Spratly Islands

Malaysian Department of Works
 Malaysian Expressway System
 Malaysian Federal Roads system
 Malaysian Highway Authority
 Malaysian National Projects
 Malaysian Public Works Department
 Malaysian State Roads system
 National Speed Limits

Official residences in Malaysia
 Istana Negara

Prime Ministers of Malaysia
 Prime Minister of Malaysia
 Abdullah Ahmad Badawi
 Mahathir Mohamad
 Hussein Onn
 Tun Abdul Razak
 Tunku Abdul Rahman
 Najib Razak
 Muhyiddin Yassin
 Ismail Sabri Yaakob
 Anwar Ibrahim

Health in Malaysia

Healthcare in Malaysia
 List of hospitals in Malaysia

Hospitals in Kedah
 Hospital Sultanah Bahiyah
 Hospital Sultan Abdul Halim
 Hospital Jitra
 Hospital Kulim
 Putra Medical Centre
 Kedah Medical Centre
 Hospital Pantai Utara

Hospitals in Penang
 Hospital Pantai Mutiara
 Penang Adventist Hospital
 Islands Hospital

Hospitals in Klang Valley
 Gleneagles Intan Medical Centre
 Hospital Universiti Kebangsaan Malaysia
 Kuala Lumpur General Hospital
 Subang Jaya Medical Centre
 Hospital Selayang
 Institiut Jantung Negara
 Hospital Sungai Buloh
 Hospital Putrajaya

History of Malaysia
 History of Malaysia
 13 May 1969 incident
 1964 racial riots in Singapore
 1969 Malaysian general election
 1988 Malaysian constitutional crisis
 Albert Kwok Fen Nam
 Adnan Bin Saidi
 Afonso de Albuquerque
 Al-Mau'nah
 American-British-Dutch-Australian Command
 Andrew Clarke (British Army officer, born 1824)
 Anglo-Dutch Treaty of 1814
 Anglo-Dutch Treaty of 1824
 Anglo-Malayan Defence Agreement
 Anglo-Siamese Treaty of 1909
 Australian 8th Division
 Barlow and Chambers execution
 Arthur Edward Barstow
 Bangsa Malaysia
 Batang Kali massacre
 Battle of Malacca (1641)
 Battle of Malaya
 Battle of North Borneo
 Battle of Penang
 Bendahara
 Bhagadatta (Langkasuka)
 Borneo campaign (1945)
 Briggs Plan
 Harold Briggs (General)
 British East India Company
 British Far East Command
 British Malaya
 British North Borneo Company
 British Resident
 Brunei Revolt
 Bujang Valley
 Bukit Cina
 Bukit Kepong Incident
 Bunga mas
 Burney Treaty
 Capture of Malacca (1511)
 Chandrabhanu
 Charles Anthoni Johnson Brooke
 Charles Vyner Brooke
 Chi Tu
 Chinese Protectorate
 Chung Keng Quee
 Dataran Merdeka
 Dewa Sura
 Dol Said
 Dutch East India Company (VOC)
 Dutch Malacca
 Durbar
 Early Malay nationalism
 Early history of Kedah
 Edward Gent
 Federated Malay States
 Force 136
 Foreign relations of Malaysia
 Founding years of modern Singapore
 Francis Light
 Frank Swettenham
 Gangga Negara
 Gemas
 Gerald Templer
 Ghee Hin Kongsi (義興公司)
 Golden Chersonese
 Hai San Secret Society (海山)
 Hang Jebat
 Hang Li Po
 Hang Tuah
 Hari Merdeka
 Henry Gurney
 Hikayat Banjar
 Hikayat Bayan Budiman
 Hikayat Hang Tuah
 History of Dikir Barat
 History of communications in Malaysia
 History of modern Penang
 Inderapura
 Indonesia-Malaysia confrontation
 James Brooke
 James W.W. Birch
 Japanese occupation of Malaya, North Borneo and Sarawak
 Jementah Civil War
 Kangchu system
 Kapitan Cina
 Ketuanan Melayu
 Klang War
 Kota Gelanggi
 Landing at Labis
 Laksamana
 Laksamana Hang Nadim
 Langkasuka
 Lanfang Republic
 Larut Wars
 Legislative Council of the Straits Settlements
 Lim Bo Seng
 List of Governors of the Straits Settlements
 List of Hikayat
 Lord President of the Federal Court
 Hugh Low
 MacDonald House bombing
 Mahmud Shah (Sultan of Malacca)
 Majapahit
 Malay College Kuala Kangsar
 The Malay Dilemma
 Malaya-Borneo Exhibition
 Malayan Communist Party
 Malayan Emergency
 Malayan People's Anti-Japanese Army
 Malayan National Liberation Army
 Malayan Union
 Malaysia Bill
 Malaysia Act 1963
 Malaysia Agreement
 Malaysian Malaysia
 Malaysian National Projects
 Malaysian New Economic Policy
 Malaysian legal history
 Malaysian Solidarity Convention (1965)
 Malaysian Solidarity Consolidation Committee
 Maphilindo
 Maria Hertogh riots
 Mat Salleh Rebellion
 May 13: Declassified Documents on the Malaysian Riots of 1969
 Mega TV
 Melayu Kingdom
 Merdeka
 Merong Mahawangsa
 Ming Shi-lu
 David Murray-Lyon
 Naksat city
 Nan Hai Ji Gui Nei Fa Zhuan (南海寄歸内法傳)
 National Culture Policy
 Ngee Heng Kongsi of Johor
 North Borneo
 North Borneo Federation
 Old Malay
 Old Pahang Kingdom
 Operation Claret
 Operation Coldstore
 Operation Krohcol
 Operation Lalang
 Operation Matador (1941)
 Harry Ord
 Pan Pan
 Pangkor Treaty of 1874
 Parameswara (sultan)
 Parit Sulong
 Pasai
 Pattani kingdom
 History of Penang
 Perak War
 Arthur Ernest Percival
 Pingat Jasa Malaysia
 Portuguese Malacca
 Postage stamps and postal history of Malaysia
 Postage stamps and postal history of the Straits Settlements
 Prehistoric Malaysia
 Raja Melewar
 Reformasi (Malaysia)
 Reid Commission
 Richard O. Winstedt
 Royal Malay Regiment
 Saiburi
 Sandakan Death Marches
 Sejarah Melayu
 Selangor Civil War or Klang War
 Setul
 Si Rat Malai
 Ivan Simson
 Singapore in Malaysia
 Sinking of Prince of Wales and Repulse
 Cecil Clementi Smith
 Sook Ching massacre
 Srivijaya
 Straits Settlements
 Sultanate of Johor
 Sultanate of Kedah
 Sultanate of Malacca
 Sultanate of Sulu
 Suvarnabhumi
 Taming Sari
 Tan Hiok Nee
 Temenggung
 Tengku Razaleigh Hamzah
 Terengganu Inscription Stone
 The Royalist
 Tuhfat al-Nafis
 Tun Ledang Shah
 Tun Perak
 Typhoon Vamei
 Unfederated Malay States
 White Rajahs
 Yap Kwan Seng
 Yijing
 Zheng He
 Zhu Fan Zhi

Disasters in Malaysia
 1989 Kedah Madrasah fire
 1998 Klang Valley water crisis
 1990 Kuala Lumpur–Karak Highway crash
 2003 Merapoh bus tragedy
 2005 Malaysian haze
 2006 Malaysian haze
 2006 Nibong Tebal bus crash
 Effect of the 2004 Indian Ocean earthquake on Malaysia
 Floods in Malaysia
 Highland Towers collapse
 Sultan Abdul Halim ferry terminal bridge collapse

Elections in Malaysia
 Elections in Malaysia
 1962 Singapore national referendum
 1978 Malaysian general election
 1959 Malayan general election
 1969 Malaysian general election
 1999 Malaysian general election
 2004 Malaysian general election
 2005 Pengkalan Pasir by-election
 2006 Sarawak state election
 1963 Singapore general election
 2008 Malaysian general election

Federation of Malaya
 Federation of Malaya
 Far East Strategic Reserve
 Federal Legislative Council
 List of High Commissioners from the United Kingdom to Malaya
 Malayan Emergency
 List of High Commissioners from New Zealand to Malaya

History of Sabah
 British North Borneo Company
 British North Borneo dollar
 Malaya and British Borneo dollar
 North Borneo
 North Borneo Federation
 North Borneo Railway
 Sabah dispute
 Sandakan Death Marches

History of Kuala Lumpur
 Kuala Lumpurian

1998 Commonwealth Games
 1998 Commonwealth Games
 1998 Commonwealth Games medal count
 Cricket at the 1998 Commonwealth Games

Competitors at the 1998 Commonwealth Games
 Simon Archer
 Alexandre Despatie

Athletes at the 1998 Commonwealth Games
 Diane Modahl
 Denis Petushinskiy

Cyclists at the 1998 Commonwealth Games
 Bradley Wiggins

Years in Malaysia
 1946 in Malaysia
 1948 in Malaysia
 1951 in Malaysia
 1955 in Malaysia
 1956 in Malaysia
 1957 in Malaysia
 1958 in Malaysia
 1959 in Malaysia
 1960 in Malaysia
 1961 in Malaysia
 1962 in Malaysia
 1963 in Malaysia
 1964 in Malaysia
 1965 in Malaysia
 1966 in Malaysia
 1967 in Malaysia
 1968 in Malaysia
 1969 in Malaysia
 1970 in Malaysia
 1971 in Malaysia
 1972 in Malaysia
 1973 in Malaysia
 1974 in Malaysia
 1975 in Malaysia
 1976 in Malaysia
 1977 in Malaysia
 1978 in Malaysia
 1979 in Malaysia
 1980 in Malaysia
 1981 in Malaysia
 1982 in Malaysia
 1983 in Malaysia
 1984 in Malaysia
 1985 in Malaysia
 1986 in Malaysia
 1987 in Malaysia
 1988 in Malaysia
 1989 in Malaysia
 1990 in Malaysia
 1991 in Malaysia
 1992 in Malaysia
 1993 in Malaysia
 1994 in Malaysia
 1995 in Malaysia
 1996 in Malaysia
 1997 in Malaysia
 1998 in Malaysia
 1999 in Malaysia
 2000 in Malaysia
 2001 in Malaysia
 2002 in Malaysia
 2003 in Malaysia
 2004 in Malaysia
 2005 in Malaysia
 2006 in Malaysia
 2007 in Malaysia

1998 in Malaysia

2005 in Malaysia and Singapore
 Malaysian lock-up detainee abuse scandal

2006 in Malaysia and Singapore
 2006 in Malaysia
 2007 in Malaysia
 2006 in Singapore
 2006 Malaysian Grand Prix

Malaysian law
 Article 153 of the Constitution of Malaysia
 Article 160 of the Constitution of Malaysia
 Courts of Malaysia
 Internal Security Act (Malaysia)
 Internal Security Act (Malaysia)
 Lord President of the Federal Court
 Malaysia Law Reform Committee
 Malaysian Maritime Enforcement Agency Act 2004
 Parliamentary Services Act
 Wildlife Conservation Enactment

Human rights in Malaysia
 Human rights in Malaysia
 Baldgate
 Human Rights Commission of Malaysia
 Internal Security Act (Malaysia)
 Malaysian lock-up detainee abuse scandal
 Malaysians Against Death Penalty & Torture (MADPET)
 National Human Rights Society
 Operation Lalang
 Suaram
 WAO
 Irene Xavier
 Censorship in Malaysia
 Sexual harassment in Malaysia

Law enforcement in Malaysia
 Inspector General of Police
 Royal Malaysian Police
 Malaysian Special Branch
 Pasukan Gerakan Khas

Malaysia-related lists
 List of Governors of the Straits Settlements

Malaysian honours list
 Malay titles
 Agong's honours list
 Melaka honours list
 Pahang honours list
 Perak honours list
 Selangor honours list

Malaysian media
 .my
 Malaysia Today
 Malaysiakini
 Bernama
 xBlog ☪ Bonology.com
 my Malaysia News https://web.archive.org/web/20111129223837/http://www.mymalaysianews.com/ Online News hub

Malaysian magazines
 Majalah Starz (magazine)
 Marie Claire

Malaysian publications
 Gempak
 Kreko
 Ujang

Malaysian television
 List of television stations in Malaysia
 List of television stations in Southeast Asia
 Akademi Fantasia
 Astro (television)
 NJOI
 Aswamedham
 Mega TV
 U Television
 ABNXcess
 Unifi TV
 Berita RTM
 Sukan RTM

Malaysian television series
 Malaysian Idol
 One in a Million (Malaysian TV series)

Malaysian television dramas
 Trio & a Bed
 K.A.M.I
 Gol & Gincu
 Bio-Nik

Television stations in Malaysia
 8TV (Malaysian TV network)
 NTV7
 TV1 (Malaysian TV network)
 TV2 (Malaysian TV network)
 TV Okey
 TV Alhijrah
 Awesome TV
 TV Pendidikan
 TV9 (Malaysian TV network)
 TVS (TV Sarawak)

Newspapers published in Malaysia
 List of newspapers in Malaysia
 BERNAMA
 Berita Harian
 Borneo Post
 Business Times
 Daily Express (Sabah)
 Guang Ming
 Harian Metro
 Kwong Wah Yit Poh
 The Malay Mail
 Malaysian Today
 Nanyang Siang Pau
 New Sabah Times
 New Straits Times
 Oriental Daily News (Malaysia)
 Overseas Chinese Daily News
 Sarawak Tribune
 Sin Chew Jit Poh (Singapore)
 Sin Chew Daily
 The Star (Malaysia)
 The Edge (Malaysia)
 Utusan Malaysia
 The Sun (Malaysia)
 Sinar Harian

Radio stations in Malaysia
 List of radio stations in Malaysia
 Ai FM
 Asyik FM
 Best 104
 ERA.FM
 FM Stereo Johor Bahru
 Johor FM
 KL FM
 Melaka FM
 Minnal FM
 Mutiara FM
 Muzik FM
 One FM
 My FM
 Selangor FM
 Time Highway Radio
 TraXX FM
 Hitz.FM
 Mix.FM
 Hot FM (Malaysia Radio Network)
 Sabahan.FM http://sabahan.fm/listen.pls 1st Sabahan Online Radio

Military of Malaysia
 Malaysian Royal Armoured Corps
 Awards and decorations of the Malaysian Armed Forces
 KD Mahawangsa
 Kor Ordnans Diraja
 Kor Perkhidmatan Am
 Laksamana Class Corvette
 Royal Malay Regiment
 Malayan People's Anti-Japanese Army
 Malaysian Army
 Malaysian National Service
 Military of Malaysia
 Operation Astute
 Panglima Gagah Berani
 Pasukan Udara Tentera Darat
 Royal Ranger Regiment
 Rejimen Askar Wataniah
 Rejimen Gerak Khas
 Royal Malaysian Air Force
 Royal Malaysian Navy
 Seri Pahlawan Gagah Perkasa

Formations of the Malaysian Army
 Malaysian Royal Armoured Corps
 Kor Ordnans DiRaja
 Royal Malay Regiment
 Royal Ranger Regiment

Malaysian Army Combat Arms
 Malaysian Royal Armoured Corps
 Royal Malay Regiment
 Royal Ranger Regiment

Malaysian Army Combat Support Arms

Malaysian Army Service Support Arms

Malaysian Army Special Forces

Malaysian Territorial Army

Special forces of Malaysia
 10 Paratrooper Brigade
 21 Gerup Gerak Khas
 Paskal
 PASKAU
 Pasukan Gerakan Khas

Organisations based in Malaysia
 Angkasa
 E-pek@k
 Persatuan Belia Generasi Prihatin Felda Cerul, Kemaman
 All Malaysia Malayalee Association

Malaysian people

 Ven. Dr. Kirinde Sri Dhammananda Nāyaka Thero
 Salleh Abas
 Abby Abadi
 Abu Bakar bin Abdul Jamal
 Abdul Kadir Yusuf
 Abdullah Ahmad
 Abdullah Ahmad Badawi
 Amber Chia
 Ariffin Mohamed
 Awie
 Azhar Mansor
 Aziz M. Osman
 Carmen Soo
 Jason Chan
 Rose Chan
 Datuk Ooi Chean See
 Nicol David
 Endon Mahmood
 Eric Leong
 Lina Joy
 Fasha Sandha
 Sean Ghazi
 Ahmad Fairuz Abdul Halim
 Azahari Husin
 Ielias Ibrahim
 Azlan Iskandar
 Ismail Mohd Ali
 Tiara Jacquelina
 Jalaluddin Hassan
 Jamal Abdillah
 Jeff Ooi
 Mohammad Nor Khalid
 Khoo Kay Kim
 Ling Tan
 John Ling
 MGG Pillai
 Mokhzani Mahathir
 Paula Malai Ali
 Julie Sudiro
 Megat Khas Megat Omar
 Mohammad Noordin Sopiee
 Hani Mohsin
 Eric Moo
 Paul Moss
 Nicolette Palikat
 Paul de Thouars
 Peter Pek
 P. Ramlee
 Rosyam Nor
 Nur Amalina Che Bakri
 Shad Saleem Faruqi
 Sheikh Abdullah Ahmad
 Sheila Majid
 K. R. Somasundram
 Yap Soon-Yeong
 Osu Sukam
 Jomo Kwame Sundaram
 Penny Tai
 Too Phat
 Lillian Too
 Took Leng How
 Virginia and Naomi Leong
 Irene Xavier
 Yap Ah Loy
 Ken Yeang
 Vinx Lin Yi Xin
 Joanne Yeoh
 Ahmad Zamil
 Ziana Zain

Chinese Malaysians

 Tan Kee Soon
 Tan Hiok Nee
 Tan Cheng Lock
 Tan Siew Sin
 Tan Kee Soon
 Tye Kee Yoon
 Khoo Thean Teik
 Chung Keng Quee
 Yap Ah Loy
 Ong Seok Kim
 Bhante Sujiva
 Venerable Chi Chern
 Albert Kwok Fen Nam
 Wu Lien-teh
 Ah Niu
 Angelica Lee Sin Je
 Tash Aw
 Chan Kong Choy
 Jimmy Choo (designer)
 Imee Ooi
 Fong Chan Onn
 Fong Kui Lun
 Hang Li Po
 Robert Kuok
 Daniel Lee Chee Hun
 Carol Chu
 Fish Leong
 Vinx Lin Yi Xin
 Lim Keng Yaik
 Vincent Tan
 Zang Toi
 Lim Goh Tong
 Lim Kok Thay
 Lillian Too
 Wong Ah Kiu
 Tsai Ming-liang
 Guang Liang
 Yap Kwan Seng
 Francis Yeoh
 Michelle Yeoh
 Alex Yoong
 Lee Chong Wei

Monarchs of Malaysia
 Yang di-Pertuan Agong
 Malay Ruler
 Ahmad Shah of Malaysia
 Azlan Shah
 Tuanku Jaafar
 Salahu’d-Din of Malaysia
 Sultan Hisamuddin Alam Shah
 Sultan Iskandar
 Sultan Ismail Nasiruddin Shah
 Tuanku Abdul Halim
 Tuanku Abdul Rahman
 Tuanku Syed Putra
 Tuanku Syed Sirajuddin
 Yahya Petra
 Yang di-Pertua Negeri
 Yang di-Pertuan Besar

Monarchs of Johor
 Sultan Abu Bakar of Johor
 Sultan Ali of Johor
 Sultan Ibrahim
 Sultan Iskandar
 Sultan Ismail
 Sultan of Johor

Monarchs of Kedah
 Abdul Hamid Halim
 Badlishah
 Tuanku Abdul Halim
 Zainal Rashid Muadzam III

Monarchs of Kelantan
 Sultan Ismail Petra of Kelantan
 Yahya Petra

Monarchs of Pahang
 Ahmad Shah of Malaysia
 Sultan Abu Bakar of Pahang

Monarchs of Perak
 Azlan Shah
 Idris Shah II of Perak
 Sultan Abdul Aziz of Perak
 Sultan Abdul Jalil of Perak
 Sultan Iskandar of Perak
 Sultan Yusuf Izzuddin Shah
 Sultan of Perak

Monarchs of Selangor
 Salahu’d-Din of Malaysia
 Sultan Abdul Samad
 Sultan Hisamuddin Alam Shah
 Sultan Musa Ghiatuddin Riayat Shah
 Sultan Sharafuddin
 Sultan Sulaiman
 Sultan of Selangor

Monarchs of Terengganu
 Sultan Ismail Nasiruddin Shah
 Sultan Mahmud Al-Muktafi Billah Shah
 Sultan Mizan Zainal Abidin

Malaysian people by occupation

Malaysian architects
 Ken Yeang
 Hijjaz Kasturi
 Azhar Sulaiman
 Samy Vellu

Malaysian diplomats
 Razali Ismail

Malaysian sportspeople
 R Arumugam
 Mokhtar Dahari
 Nicol David
 Lee Chong Wei

Malaysian athletes
 Govindasamy Saravanan

Malaysian badminton players
 Chan Chong Ming
 Chew Choon Eng
 Chin Eei Hui
 Lee Chong Wei
 Wong Choong Hann
 Roslin Hashim
 Lee Wan Wah
 Wong Pei Tty

Malaysian F1 drivers
 Mohamed Fairuz Fauzy
 Alex Yoong

Malaysian rally drivers
 Karamjit Singh

Malaysian squash players
 Nicol David
 Azlan Iskandar
 Ong Beng Hee

People of Malaysian descent

Malaysian Australians
 Kamahl
 Guy Sebastian
 Virginia and Naomi Leong
 James Wan
 Che'Nelle

Malaysian New Zealanders
 Bic Runga

Tamil Malaysians
 K. R. Somasundram
 Ananda Krishnan
 M. Magendran
 Shoba Purushothaman
 Samy Vellu

Royal families of Malaysia
 Raja Permaisuri Agong
 Tengku Afzan
 Tuanku Bahiyah
 Tuanku Bainun
 Tengku Budriah
 Raja Jemaah
 Tunku Kurshiah
 Tunku Najihah
 Tengku Intan Zaharah
 Tengku Razaleigh Hamzah
 Tuanku Siti Aishah
 Tunku Abdul Rahman
 Tunku Besar
 Tunku Mukhriz
 Tengku Zainab
 Tengku Zanariah

Politics of Malaysia
 Attorney General of Malaysia
 Barisan Nasional Backbenchers Club
 Cabinet of Malaysia
 Chief Minister of Penang
 Chief Minister of Sarawak
 Chief Whip (Malaysia)
 Conference of Rulers
 Internal Security Act (Malaysia)
 Internal Security Act (Malaysia)
 Kesatuan Melayu United Kingdom
 Ketuanan Melayu
 Legislative Council of the Straits Settlements
 Malaysian Malaysia
 Malaysian legal history
 PAP-UMNO relations
 Politics of Malaysia
 Reformasi (Malaysia)
 Sisters in Islam
 Social contract (Malaysia)
 Ultra (Malaysia)

Political parties in Malaysia

 Opposition (Malaysia)
 Barisan Alternatif
 Barisan Nasional
 Communist Party of Malaya/Marxist-Leninist
 Communist Party of Malaya/Revolutionary Faction
 Democratic Action Party
 Liberal Democratic Party (Malaysia)
 Malayan Communist Party
 Malaysian Chinese Association
 Malaysian Dayak Congress
 Malaysian Indian Congress
 Malaysian Workers' Party
 North Kalimantan Communist Party
 PAS (political party)
 Pan Malaysian Islamic Front
 Parti Bangsa Dayak Sarawak
 Parti Bersatu Rakyat Sabah
 Parti Bersatu Sabah
 Parti Gerakan Rakyat Malaysia
 Parti Keadilan Rakyat
 Parti Negara
 Parti Rakyat Malaysia
 People's Progressive Party (Malaysia)
 Sarawak Peoples Party
 Sarawak Progressive Democratic Party
 Sarawak United People's Party
 Semangat 46
 Singapore Alliance
 United Malays National Organisation
 United Pasokmomogun Kadazandusun Murut Organisation
 United Traditional Bumiputera Party
 Wong sai hou

Political parties in Sabah
 Liberal Democratic Party (Malaysia)
 Parti Bersatu Rakyat Sabah
 Parti Bersatu Sabah
 Sabah Progressive Party
 United Pasokmomogun Kadazandusun Murut Organisation

Malaysian politicians
 Abang Haji Openg
 Abang Muhammad Salahuddin
 Abdul Ghafar Baba
 Abdul Kadir Yusuf
 Abdul Rahman Ya'kub
 Ahmad Shabery Cheek
Anthony Loke
 Anwar Ibrahim
 Abdullah Ahmad Badawi
 Badruddin Amiruldin
 Betty Chew
 Chan Seng Khai
 Chin Peng
 Chong Chieng Jen
 Chong Eng
 Daim Zainuddin
 Fong Chan Onn
 Fong Chong Pik
 Fong Kui Lun
 Fong Po Kuan
Gobind SIngh Deo
 Harun bin Idris
 Hishammuddin Hussein
 Kerk Kim Hock
 Wan Azizah Wan Ismail
 Jaafar Haji Muhammad
 Jamaluddin Jarjis
 Joseph Pairin Kitingan
 Khairy Jamaluddin
 Koh Tsu Koon
 Teresa Kok
 Lee Lam Thye
 Lim Chong Eu
 Lim Guan Eng
 Lim Keng Yaik
 Lim Kit Siang
 Abdul Taib Mahmud
Mahathir bin Mohamad
 Megat Junid Megat Ayub
 Mohamad Noah bin Omar
Mohamed Azmin Ali
 Mohamed Nazri Abdul Aziz
 Mustapa Mohamed
 Mohammad Said bin Yusof
 Mohd Khir bin Toyo
 Muhyiddin Yassin
 Musa Hitam
 Nik Aziz Nik Mat
 Ong Ka Ting
 Onn Jaafar
 Hussein Onn
 Osu Sukam
 Abdul Ghani Othman
 Ismail Abdul Rahman
 Tun Abdul Razak
 Najib Tun Razak
 Samsudin Osman
 Samy Vellu
 Shahrir Abdul Samad
 Karpal Singh
 Syed Hamid Albar
 Syed Hussein Alatas
 Syed Jaafar Albar
 Syed Nasir Ismail
Syed Saddiq
 Tan Chee Khoon
 Tan Cheng Lock
 Tan Seng Giaw
 Tan Siew Sin
 Tengku Razaleigh Hamzah
 Tun Sardon Jubir
 Tunku Abdul Rahman
 Dato' Megat Yunus

Politics of Sabah

Science and technology in Malaysia
 Angkasawan human spaceflight program
 Malaysian Space Agency (MYSA)
 National Space Agency (Malaysia) (ANGKASA)
 Malaysian Remote Sensing Agency (MRSA)

Malaysian society
 Ah Beng
 Ah Lian
 Bumiputra
 Demographics of Malaysia
 E-pek@k
 Holidays in Malaysia
 Illegal immigration to Malaysia
 The Malay Dilemma
 Malay titles
 Malaysian National Service
 Malaysian citizenship
 Megat
 Pendatang asing
 Persekutuan Pengakap Malaysia
 Public holidays of Malaysia
 Recom
 Syburi
 Tamil diaspora
 Wawasan 2020
 Yang di-Pertuan Agong

Cham
 Cham alphabet
 Champa
 Cham language
 Cham people
 Tsat language
 Utsul

Ethnic groups in Malaysia
 Ayertawarian
 Babulang
 Bajau
 Banjar people
 Batek
 Bidayuh
 Bisaya (Borneo)
 Bruneian Malay
 Bukitan
 Cham people
 Chinese Malaysian
 Chitty
 Dayak people
 Dumpas
 Dusun
 Iban people
 Ida'an
 Illanun
 Indian Malaysian
 Jakuns
 Javanese people
 Kadazan
 Kadazan-Dusun
 Kedayan
 Kelabit
 Kristang people
 Kwijau
 Lotud
 Malays (ethnic group)
 Malaysian Malays
 Malaysian Malayali
 Malaysian Malay
 Mandailing
 Mangka'ak
 Maragang
 Melanau
 Minangkabau
 Minokok
 Murut people
 Orang Asli
 Orang Laut
 Orang Sungai
 Orang Ulu
 Penan
 Peranakan Chinese
 Proto Malay
 Punan
 Rumanau
 Rungu (Borneo ethnic group)
 Siamese Malaysian
 Seafarers
 Semai
 Semang
 Senoi
 Tambanuo
 Tidong

Ethnic groups in Sabah
 Bajau
 Bruneian Malay people
 Ida'an
 Kadazan-Dusun
 Kedayan
 Lotud
 Minokok
 Murut people
 Nunuk Ragang
 Orang Cocos
 Rumanau
 Rungu (Borneo ethnic group)
 Tambanuo
 Tidong

Residency in Malaysia
 Malaysia My Second Home

States of Malaysia
 States of Malaysia
 Federal Territory (Malaysia)
 Johor
 Kedah
 Kelantan
 Malacca
 Negeri Sembilan
 Pahang
 Penang
 Perak
 Perlis
 Sarawak
 Selangor
 State emblem of Malaysia
 Terengganu

Johor
 Johor
 Abdul Ghani Othman
 Johor State Anthem
 Tanjung Piai

Kedah
 Kedah
 Alor Setar
 Langkawi
 Baling
 Sungai Petani
 Azizan Abdul Razak
 Mahathir bin Mohamad
 Kota Setar
 Kubang Pasu
 Padang Terap
 Universiti Utara Malaysia

Malacca
 Malacca
 Bukit Cina
 Malacca Town
 Melaka Manipal Medical College
 Naning
 Pulau Besar (Malacca)
 Kolej Yayasan Saad

Negeri Sembilan
 Negeri Sembilan
 Jelebu
 Jempol
 Raja Melewar
 Tuanku Abdul Rahman
 Undang

Pahang
 Pahang
 Bentong
 Bera Lake
 Bera, Pahang
 Bukit Tinggi, Pahang
 Jerantut
 Kuala Lipis
 Maran, Pahang
 Pekan
 Raub
 Rompin
 Temerloh

Penang
 Architecture of Penang
 Chingay Parade
 Culture of Penang
 Education in Penang
 George Town, Penang
 Gurney Drive
 History of Penang
 History of modern Penang
 Jerejak
 Penang
 Penang Botanic Gardens
 Penang cuisine
 Penang Ferry Service
 Penang Hill
 Penang Hokkien
 Place and street names of Penang
 Pulau Aman
 Pulau Betong
 Pulau Gedung
 Seberang Perai
 Tourism in Penang
 Universiti Sains Malaysia

Expressways and highways in Penang
 Butterworth Outer Ring Road
 Butterworth–Kulim Expressway
 Jelutong Expressway
 Penang Bridge
 Penang Outer Ring Road
 Penang Second Bridge

Perak
 Perak
 Batang Padang
 Damar Laut
 Dato' Seri Megat Jaafar
 Hulu Perak
 Ipoh
 Kerian
 Kinta
 Kuala Kangsar
 Larut, Matang
 Manjung
 Perak Tengah
 Perak football team

Sabah
 Public holidays of Sabah
 Sabah
 Sabah Medical Centre
 Tawau International Airport

Divisions of Sabah
 Interior Division
 Kudat Division
 Sandakan Division
 Tawau Division
 West Coast Division

Education in Sabah
 List of schools in Sabah

Health in Sabah
 Sabah Medical Centre

Tourism in Sabah
 Beaufort, Sabah
 Kapalai
 North Borneo Railway
 Sipadan

Transportation in Sabah
 Kota Kinabalu International Airport
 Sabah Air
 Tawau International Airport

Sarawak
 Sarawak
 Betong Division
 Bintulu Division
 Kapit Division
 Kuching
 Kuching Division
 Kuching International Airport
 Miri
 Miri Division
 Mukah Division
 Samarahan Division
 Sarawak dollar
 Saribas
 Sarikei Division
 Sibu Division
 Sri Aman Division
 Ulu Anyut
 Ulu Baram
 Ulu Paku
 Yang di-Pertua Negeri Sarawak

Selangor
 Selangor
 Ampang
 Bukit Antarabangsa
 Bukit Tapur
 Duli Yang Maha Mulia
 Klang War
 Kota Darul Ehsan
 Selangor State Development Corporation
 Selangor honours list
 Shah Alam
 Tugu Keris

Klang Valley
 Batu Dam
 Klang Valley
 Kuala Lumpur
 Taman Melawati
 USJ

Golf clubs and courses in Klang Valley
 Glenmarie Golf and Country Club
 Kelab Golf Perkhidmatan Awam
 Kuala Lumpur Golf and Country Club
 Royal Selangor Country Club
 Saujana Golf and Country Club
 Subang National Golf Club
 Sultan Abdul Aziz Shah Golf and Country Club

Terengganu
 Terengganu
 Dungun
 Kemaman
 Kuala Terengganu
 Redang Island

Tourism in Malaysia

Airlines of Malaysia

 AirAsia
 AirAsia X
 Athena Air Services
 Berjaya Air
 Firefly
 FlyAsianXpress
 Hornbill Skyways
 Ked-Air
 Layang Layang Aerospace
 Malaysia Airlines
 Malaysia Airlines Kargo
 Malaysia Airlines destinations
 Malaysia-Singapore Airlines
 Sabah Air
 Transmile Air Services

Tourism in Johor
 Endau Rompin National Park
 National Parks and Forest Reserves of Johor

Visitor attractions in Malaysia

 Bukit Bintang
 Cheng Hoon Teng
 Malaysian Tourist Guides Council
 Penang Hill
 Tambunan Rafflesia Centre
 Tourism Malaysia

Department stores of Malaysia
 AEON (company)
 Low Yat Plaza
 Isetan
 JUSCO
 Metrojaya
 Sogo
 Tesco
 Carrefour
 Giant Hypermarket

Golf clubs and courses in Malaysia

Transport in Malaysia
 Transport in Malaysia
 Cycling in Kuala Lumpur
 Kuching International Airport
 Alor Gajah Bypass
 Ampang–Kuala Lumpur Elevated Highway
 Changlun–Kuala Perlis Highway
 Damansara–Puchong Expressway
 East Coast Expressway
 Federal Highway, Malaysia
 Integrated Transport Information System
 Jelutong Expressway
 Karak Expressway
 Lebuh Ayer Keroh
 Malaysia Federal Route 1
 Malaysia Federal Route 14
 Malaysia Federal Route 19
 Malaysia Federal Route 2
 Malaysian Expressway System
 Malaysian Federal Roads system
 Malaysian Railway System
 Malaysian Road Transport Department
 Malaysian vehicle number plates
 National Speed Limits
 New Klang Valley Expressway
 New Pantai Expressway
 North Klang Straits Bypass
 North–South Expressway
 North–South Expressway Northern Route
 North–South Expressway Southern Route
 Penang Outer Ring Road
 Penang Second Bridge
 Port Klang
 Puchong–Sungai Besi Highway
 Putrajaya–Cyberjaya Expressway
 Rapid KL
 Road signs in Malaysia
 South Klang Valley Expressway
 Subang Airport Highway

North–South Expressway Networks
 North–South Expressway
 Malaysia–Singapore Second Link
 New Klang Valley Expressway
 North–South Expressway Central Link
 North–South Expressway Northern Route
 North–South Expressway Southern Route
 Penang Bridge
 Seremban–Port Dickson Highway

Railway companies of Malaysia
 KLIA Ekspres
 KLIA Transit
 Keretapi Tanah Melayu
 North Borneo Railway
MRT Corporation
Prasarana Malaysia
 Sabah State Railway

Roads in Malaysia

Expressways and highways in Johor Bahru
 Johor Bahru Eastern Dispersal Link
 Johor Bahru Inner Ring Road
 Johor–Singapore Causeway
 Malaysia–Singapore Second Link
 Pasir Gudang Highway
 Senai Airport Highway
 Senai–Desaru Expressway
 Skudai Highway
 Skudai–Pontian Highway
 Tebrau Highway

Expressways in Malaysia
 Ampang–Kuala Lumpur Elevated Highway
 Butterworth–Kulim Expressway
 Cheras–Kajang Expressway
 Damansara–Puchong Expressway
 East Coast Expressway
 East–West Expressway/Salak Expressway
 East–West Highway (Malaysia)
 Guthrie Corridor Expressway
 Kajang Dispersal Link Expressway
 Karak Expressway
 Malaysia Federal Route 8
 Malaysia–Singapore Second Link
 Malaysian Expressway System
 Malaysian Highway Authority
 New Klang Valley Expressway
 New North Klang Straits Bypass
 New Pantai Expressway
 North–South Expressway
 North–South Expressway Central Link
 North–South Expressway Northern Route
 North–South Expressway Southern Route
 SMART Tunnel
 Seremban–Port Dickson Highway
 Shah Alam Expressway
 South Klang Valley Expressway
 Sprint Expressway
 Sungai Besi Expressway

Malaysian Federal Roads
 Malaysia Federal Route 1
 Malaysia Federal Route 2
 Malaysia Federal Route 3
 Malaysia Federal Route 4
 Malaysia Federal Route 5
 Tun Razak Highway
 Pasir Gudang Highway
 Malaysia Federal Route 23
 Malaysia Federal Route 24
 Malaysia Federal Route 50
 Malaysia Federal Route 53
 Malaysia Federal Route 54
 Malaysia Federal Route 64
 Malaysia Federal Route 74
 Changlun–Kuala Perlis Highway
 Malaysia Federal Route 92
 Malaysia Federal Route 94
 Malaysia Federal Route 95
 Malaysia Federal Route 100
 Malaysia Federal Route 139
 Malaysia Federal Route 142
 Lebuh Ayer Keroh
 Second East–West Highway
 Assam Jawa–Templer Park Highway
 Federal Highway, Malaysia
 Jelutong Expressway
 Kuala Lumpur Middle Ring Road 2
 Malaysia Federal Route 10
 Malaysia Federal Route 11
 Malaysia Federal Route 13
 Malaysia Federal Route 14
 Malaysia Federal Route 18
 Malaysia Federal Route 19
 Malaysia Federal Route 51
 Malaysia Federal Route 55
 Malaysia Federal Route 56
 Malaysia Federal Route 58
 Malaysia Federal Route 59
 Malaysia Federal Route 6
 Malaysia Federal Route 60
 Malaysia Federal Route 61
 Malaysia Federal Route 66
 Malaysia Federal Route 68
 Malaysia Federal Route 69
 Malaysia Federal Route 7
 Malaysia Federal Route 76
 Malaysia Federal Route 77
 Malaysia Federal Route 78
 Malaysia Federal Route 8
 Malaysia Federal Route 86
 Malaysia Federal Route 87
 Malaysia Federal Route 88
 Malaysia Federal Route 89
 Malaysia Federal Route 9
 Malaysia Federal Route 90
 Malaysia Federal Route 98
 Malaysia Federal Route 99
 Malaysian Federal Roads system
 Pan Borneo Highway

Water transport in Malaysia
 Penang Ferry Service

Malaysia stubs
:Category:Malaysia stubs

Malaysia geography stubs
:Category:Malaysia geography stubs
:Category:Johor geography stubs
:Category:Sabah geography stubs
:Category:Sarawak geography stubs

See also
Lists of country-related topics – similar lists for other countries